= National broadband plan =

National plans to deploy broadband Internet access

A national broadband plan is a national plan to deploy broadband Internet access. Broadband is a term normally considered to be synonymous with a high-speed connection to the internet. Suitability for certain applications, or technically a certain quality of service, is often assumed. For instance, low round trip delay (or "latency" in milliseconds) would normally be assumed to be well under 150ms and suitable for Voice over IP, online gaming, international financial transactions, virtual private networks and other latency-sensitive applications. This would rule out satellite Internet as inherently high-latency. In some applications, utility-grade reliability (measured for example in seconds per 30 years outage time as in the PSTN network) or security (say AES-128 as required for smart grid applications in the US) are often also assumed or defined as requirements. There is no single definition of broadband and official plans may refer to any or none of these criteria.

Beyond broad latency and reliability expectations, the term itself is technology neutral; broadband can be delivered by a range of technologies including DSL, fiber optic cable, powerline networking, LTE, Ethernet, Wi-Fi or next generation access. Several operators have started to combine two of these technologies to create Hybrid Access Networks. This article presents an overview of official government plans to promote broadband – based on official sources that may be biased due to their promotion of the government plan as effective and positive.

Such plans are recommended by OECD and other development agencies. All G7 countries except Canada have such a national broadband plan in place now.

Fixed broadband Internet subscriptions in 2012 as a percentage of a country's population Source: International Telecommunication Union.

Mobile broadband Internet subscriptions in 2012 as a percentage of a country's population Source: International Telecommunication Union.

== Comparisons ==
Most countries considering such plans conduct their own comparative evaluations of existing national plans. The US, for instance, in September 2010 published a comparison of seven other countries' plans. The OECD tracks closely policy in this area and publishes links to relevant policy documents from its member (developed) countries. Developing countries' plans are studied most closely by the World Bank as part of its e-Development program. It has released the World Bank Broadband Strategy Toolkit to assist in policy development.

Furthermore, the close relationship of universal wired broadband and smart grid plans is the subject of much study particularly in the US and Europe. The US plan has ambitious energy demand management goals (see National Broadband Plan (United States) for more details on these and their relationship to other US national goals) and its broadband plan is generally considered to be a pre-requisite to its communications-intensive energy strategy. This is also true to some degree of other countries' broadband plans.

== Americas ==
=== Northern America ===
==== Canada ====
As of early March 2009, colleagues in Industry Canada confirm that the current national broadband strategy is a short statement in the 2009 budget:

"Canada was one of the first countries to implement a connectivity agenda geared toward facilitating Internet access to all of its citizens. To this day, Canada remains one of the most connected nations in the world, with the highest broadband connection rate among the G7 countries. However, gaps in access to broadband remain, particularly in rural and remote communities. "The Government is committed to closing the broadband gap in Canada by encouraging the private development of rural broadband infrastructure. Budget 2009 provides $225 million over three years to Industry Canada to develop and implement a strategy on extending broadband coverage to all currently unserved communities beginning in 2009–10." The budget specifically includes:

"Providing $225 million over three years to develop and implement a strategy on extending broadband coverage to unserved communities." On 6 March 2009, Mr. John Duncan, Parliamentary Secretary to the Minister of Indian Affairs and Northern Development and Federal Interlocutor for Métis and Non-status Indians, announced that the Government of Canada will contribute $7.86 million to the First Nations Emergency Services Society (FNESS) and their partner, the First Nations Technology Council (FNTC) in British Columbia, for the construction and provision of satellite broadband network capacity connecting 21 remote First Nations communities in British Columbia.

In a 4 June 2009 news release, the CRTC endorsed the National Film Board's call for a national digital strategy.

No substantial action, followup or funding was announced in the 2010 or 2011 budgets. CANARIE remains Canada's only publicly funded backbone network. Several provinces, especially Nova Scotia, have their own plans for broadband universal service see Broadband for Rural Nova Scotia initiative but these are generally last-mile services using fixed wireless technologies (Motorola Canopy in the case of Nova Scotia). No province is covered with public backhaul available to general public & business, though some provinces, regions and municipalities own some fiber.

==== United States ====
In the American Recovery and Reinvestment Act of 2009 – popularly referred to as a post-recession stimulus package – Congress charged the US Federal Communications Commission with creating a national broadband plan. The Recovery Act required the plan to explore several key elements of broadband deployment and use, and the commission now seeks comment on these elements, including:

- The most effective and efficient ways to ensure broadband access for all Americans
- Strategies for achieving affordability and maximum utilization of broadband infrastructure and services
- Evaluation of the status of broadband deployment, including the progress of related grant programs
- How to use broadband to advance consumer welfare, civic participation, public safety and homeland security, community development, health care delivery, energy independence and efficiency, education, worker training, private sector investment, entrepreneurial activity, job creation, and economic growth, and other national purposes.

The plan was published in March 2010, on the same website used to gather public comment during its preparation.

The plan is integrated with the US smart grid policies. A major purpose of the broadband plan is to enable M2M communications for that purpose.

=== Latin America and the Caribbean ===
==== Argentina ====
The number of Internet users in the country has been estimated at 26 million (2010), of which 5 million, by late 2010, were broadband users (82% of which were residential and 81% of which connected at a speed of least 512 kbit/s), and over 1.3 were wireless and satellite users.

Among residential users, 38.3% were located in Buenos Aires Province (including Greater Buenos Aires), 26.0% in the city of Buenos Aires, 8.2% in Córdoba and 7.4% in Santa Fe Province. According to a 2010 report by IDC Consulting, Argentina has a rate of 9.3 broadband accounts per 100 inhabitants, only surpassed in the region by Chile, which registered 9.7. Despite this relatively good national indicator, the penetration of Internet is not the same in all provinces, and some provinces, like Jujuy, have only 0.2 per 100 inhabitants; Formosa Province 0.3; Corrientes Province 0.4; and Tucumán Province 0.7.

To reduce this disparity between provinces, in October 2010 the government presented a five-year plan, with an initial investment of 8,000 million pesos, called Plan Nacional de Telecomunicación "Argentina Conectada" ("Connected Argentina" – National Telecommunications Plan), under command of the state-owned enterprise ARSAT.

Most of the financing is intended for the acquisition of the high-tech material required. The main goal is to expand broadband to the whole national territory, and to cover more than 10 million homes with a connection by the year 2015. This is supposed to duplicate the present number of residences which have access to these services, and to quintuple the penetration of optical fiber in the country.

==== Brazil ====
In October 2009, the Brazilian Agency of Telecommunications sought to tighten rules on domestic broadband service providers which, if implemented, could force firms such as Telefónica of Spain and Mexico's América Móvil to increase their investments in the country, according to local daily O Estado de S. Paulo reports. It is understood the new rules are designed to improve customer service with a specific focus on the delivery of stated broadband connection speeds; around 50% of users are currently thought to receive less than half the speed promised by their Internet service provider (ISP). New legislation could enter into force in 2010 requiring domestic broadband providers to comply with stricter standards on service quality. Anatel move comes in the wake of an explosion in demand for broadband internet access which has seen user number swell to around 18 million, but also resulted in major disruptions to services – such as the recent high-profile outage of Telefónica's Speedy service which left millions of customers offline.

==== Chile ====
In October 2008, Chile's president, Michelle Bachelet, announced this week the countries' most ambitious telecoms subsidy plan ever, in terms of public investment and area of coverage. The project, which is aimed at boosting SMEs competitiveness in rural areas, will provide connectivity to more than three million people in 1,474 rural communities. The development is expected to cost US$100 million, 70% of which will be provided by the government through the Telecoms Development Fund.

- Significance: At 30 March 2008, only 0.8% of the households in rural areas in Chile have internet access. Upon completion of the project, internet network coverage will reach from 71.6% of the population to 92.2%, according to the country's telecoms regulator.

In January 2008, Chile announced its 2007–2012 Strategy for Digital Development that will articulate the efforts of the public and private spheres as to new technologies during the next years. The project was prepared by the Committee of Ministers for Digital Development and seeks to provide further impulse to the ICTs in the Trans-Andean country.

The goals on which the Chilean government will place more emphasis are to double the broadband connections to reach 2 million by 2010, to increase SMEs competition, to advance on the digitalization of the public health system, and to implement new technologies in areas deemed key, such as the provisional reform and education.

In June 2009, Chile launched a new portal in which consumers may compare offers of all internet providers.

==== Colombia ====
In April 2009, Internet usage has grown to 40 percent of the Colombian population in the last ten years, with internet subscriptions rising at an annual rate of 75 percent. Over 73 percent of internet subscribers use broadband. Despite the growth, Colombia's subscription penetration average remains sixth in Latin America, with a majority of internet subscriptions concentrated in Colombia's three largest cities. To promote information technologies (IT) and telecommunications services in rural areas, Colombia's Ministry of Information Technologies and Communications developed a comprehensive ten-year National IT plan. A US$750 million public-private Communications Fund administers plan implementation, with 60 percent of funds targeted to the Compartel rural and community development program. United States Agency for International Development (USAID) also supports the development of telecommunications networks in rural areas, as well as provides technical assistance to GOC telecommunications authorities.

The percentage of internet users has grown from 1 to 40 percent of the population—or approximately 17 million people—within the last decade. Permanent internet subscribers have also grown at an annual rate of 75 percent in the last five years, although the actual number of subscriptions remains low at 2 million. Colombia's penetration average (the internet subscription to population ratio) is 4.3, ranking it sixth in Latin America behind Chile, Argentina, Uruguay, Mexico and Brazil. Likewise, 55 percent of subscriptions remain concentrated in the cities of Bogotá, Medellín and Cali.

Colombia has 1.45 million internet subscribers with broadband access—approximately 73 percent of total subscriptions. (Note: Colombia's Telecommunications Regulations Commission (CRT) defines broadband as an internet service with a minimum download speed of 512 kbit/s, which is faster than the 128 kbit/s download speed defined as broadband by the International Telecommunication Union (ITU).) DSL (63 percent) and cable (32 percent) dominate the broadband market share, with Wimax (5 percent) a distant third. The main providers according to market share are: Empresa de Telefonos de Bogota (25 percent); EPM Telecommunications (24 percent); Colombia Telecommunications (20 percent); Telmex Hogar (19 percent); and independent providers (12 percent). These providers focus on triple-play packages combining internet, television and telephone services, which has contributed to the rapid expansion of internet usage. Carlos Forero, the vice-president of the CRT, said that broadband and associated value-added services are now seen as the market differentiator between telecommunications providers.

Last year the Ministry of Communications (MOC) announced a National IT Plan, establishing three main goals to be achieved before 2019: 70 percent of Colombians with internet subscriptions, 100 percent of health and education establishments with internet access, and 100 percent of rural areas with internet access. The MOC plans to achieve these objectives through its flagship community and rural development program Compartel, which is funded by a US$750 million public-private National Communications Fund. (Note: All telecommunications providers are required to assist the Ministry of Communications in financing the Compartel program, with private sector contributions equaling 15 percent of Compartel's total budget in 2008.) Compartel provides subsidies or investment incentives to establish internet networks and telephony services in Colombia's most rural and impoverished areas. Since 2008, the program has invested US$421 million in rural networks, benefiting 16,000 rural educational, health and government institutions.

In addition to Compartel, the GOC also supports additional programs in the educational, health, entrepreneurial, competitiveness, online-government and research sectors. Activities in 2008 included the distribution of refurbished computers to educational institutions (US$86 million), connectivity financing for small and medium enterprises ($15 million), conversion of all public institutions to online institutions ($70 million), and e-medicine ($5 million).

USAID also promotes telecommunications connectivity for underserved and rural populations, as well as education and content to support economic and social development, through its Last Mile Initiative. Major contributors to this public-private alliance are Avantel, Intel, Cisco, Microsoft, Google, Polyvision, regional and local governments, and the MOC. Through the program, USG-provided equipment and training will connect 50 municipalities in the departments of Meta, Huila and Magdalena, including 21,000 small businesses and 325,000 institutions such as schools, hospitals, justice houses and local government offices. On the technical side, USAID assisted the MOC with the development of its National Plan and presently advises the CRT on "unbundling the local loop" to increase competition in broadband provision.

Colombia remains behind Latin American neighbors such as Mexico, Brazil and Argentina in most IT indicators, but since the GOC privatized its state-owned National Telecommunications Company in 2003, the IT sector has expanded rapidly. The sector contributed a record 3 percent of total GDP in 2008. Local experts agree that IT sector will continue to experience accelerated growth as Colombia's domestic security situation improves and the legal economy strengthens. However, they also emphasize that continued private investment is key to the GOC achieving its lofty goals by 2019.

==== Dominican Republic ====
In October 2009, the Dominican Republic's telecoms regulator, Instituto Dominicano de las Telecomunicaciones (INDOTEL), has said it has plans to roll out fixed line telecoms services to an additional 1,000 rural communities as part of an initiative aimed at providing broadband and home voice services to all towns with more than 300 inhabitants. According to TeleGeography's GlobalComms database, the announcement comes just over a year after fixed line incumbent CODETEL inked a deal with INDOTEL to undertake a rural connectivity project that will see investment of US$100 million.

In April 2009, this cable presents initial reporting on broadband deployment initiatives in the Dominican Republic (reftel). There is one ongoing government initiative to provide broadband access to 508 rural communities that is scheduled to finish by September. While future incentives are being considered by the regulatory agency, no others currently exist and broadband expansion is further hampered by 28 percent in taxes levied on all telecommunications sales. A Senate committee announced on 30 March it would review and update of the 1998 telecommunications law.

The Dominican Telecommunications Institute (INDOTEL), the GoDR regulatory agency, launched a tender in 2007 for a Rural Broadband Connectivity Program. At that time, only 30 percent of the country's 383 municipalities had broadband capacity. The tender offered a subsidy of up to US$5 million. The winning bidder was Codetel (Mexican-owned), the largest company in the market, which offered to connect the 508 communities with no cash subsidy but rather in exchange for the rights to a WiMax frequency in the country. INDOTEL Executive Director Joelle Exarhakos told EconOff that the program has proceeded successfully and more than 100 rural communities have already been connected. She said Codetel would complete the broadband deployment plan by September 2009. By that time, every municipality in the country will have broadband access. Under the program, Codetel provides 256 kB/second or faster service to rural communities at prices that match the prices charged in urban centers where Codetel competes with other providers.

Exarhakos told EconOff that INDOTEL does not have current plans for a second stage for the rural connectivity program, noting that with the completion of this plan, every municipality in the country will have broadband access. She said that in a number of these communities, local entrepreneurs have built connections to the networks servicing even smaller communities nearby. Nonetheless, INDOTEL does not foresee a second stage of the rural program to venture into even smaller villages. But Exarhakos told EconOff that she believes such incentives might not be necessary; part of the goal of the Rural Connectivity Program was to demonstrate rural residents' capacity to pay and it has. In Monte Plata, a national provider, Dijitec, is developing infrastructure without any government incentive to compete with Codetel.

In a number of these communities, INDOTEL has set up Informatics Training Centers (CCI), where schoolchildren and residents can access the Internet and learn how to use computers. These centers are among the 846 centers around the country that INDOTEL has established as part of an information technology promotion program. INDOTEL provides the hardware and software for the centers and community groups, schools, churches or town governments maintain and operate the facilities. EconOff visited one such site in October 2008 at a church in Samaná which was inoperable because there were no funds to pay the electricity bill. Asked about these issues, Exarhakos candidly acknowledged that some of the committees have not succeeded in maintaining the facilities. (Note: Following the meeting with INDOTEL, EconOff learned from the Samana church pastor that the facility remains closed six months later. Although the electricity bill is paid, they have been waiting for two weeks for INDOTEL to provide a needed battery. He said he does not know how to fund the CCI in the future.)

Sur Futuro is one of the non-governmental organizations that has taken on the operations of CCIs, and runs three centers in communities where the organization is also otherwise involved. The group's education director told EconOff that while INDOTEL's CCI program provides an excellent service to communities, the lack of long-term funding limits its impact. She said it costs between US$500 and 850 monthly to operate a CCI, funds that are difficult to come across in poor communities. Sur Futuro's president noted that she is aware that the Catholic Church struggles to maintain the CCIs it runs.

Codetel's participation in the rural broadband program has been directed by Ahmed Awad, who said the company's total cost of the program is about US$50 million. He said that while Codetel views it as a social investment, it has also proven relatively commercially successful.

In addition to installing and maintaining the infrastructure for broadband connectivity in the 508 communities, Codetel is responsible for setting up an entrepreneur program, establishing an Internet portal for the program and providing training in each community participating in the program. In the entrepreneur program, Codetel has helped small businesspeople in a number of the communities invest an average of US$1000 to start up internet cafes or international call centers. The Internet portal, which Codetel hired an NGO to construct, features geographic, demographic and other facts about each of the 508 communities. Awad told EconOff he believes it is the only database of information about these forgotten locales. The training provided by Codetel is limited to a one-hour workshop provided to the highest level of school taught in each municipality. Awad said that while the schools have received the trainers positively, he noted that one hour was insufficient to provide much training to the students.

Awad told EconOff that the installed connections are 80 percent wireless, but that despite the fact that this provides the opportunity for cellular-only service in these areas, multiple customers want wired hardware in their homes despite the higher costs. Because the service is wireless, a number of locales contiguous to the participating communities have gained broadband access, Awad said. "In addition to the 508 municipalities, another 150 or so villages will receive service because of the wireless reach," he told EconOff.

Awad said he hoped that INDOTEL would launch a sequel to this program, noting that there are another 1500 communities that lack broadband access. However, he lamented the fact that the sector does not have an ongoing focalized subsidy that would reduce costs to rural users, which would make these consumers a more attractive target for private investment. He also commented that the country needs more investment in information technology (IT) education in order to take advantage of the growing broadband penetration and stimulate demand for these services. Perhaps most importantly, though, he cited the lack of reliable electricity as one of the highest hurdles impeding broadband growth both in rural communities and nationwide.

Instead of providing incentives for growth, the GoDR has a policy of discouraging it with high taxes. In a 2 April interview with the newspaper Hoy, Codetel President Oscar Pena complained that the Dominican Republic has the fourth highest taxes on telecommunications of any country in the world, at 28 percent, and a 3 percent municipal tax appears likely to increase this burden even further. Pena said that the implementation of the 3 percent tax would send a strong negative signal to investors.

==== Ecuador ====
In August 2009, BNamericas reports that Ecuador's telecoms watchdog Senatel aims to end 2010 with 9,000 schools connected to the internet via broadband networks under a national scheme, compared to 1,900 today, with 4,000 of the new connections to be made this year. A further 11,000 schools are to be covered by other public-funded social programmes, universal access fund Fodetel told BNamericas, adding that state-run telco Corporacion Nacional de Telecomunicaciones (CNT) is currently handling all rollouts, and as yet there had been no plans announced to open up tenders to private sector broadband operators. The news site wrote that telecoms regulator Conatel lists ongoing projects to connect 759 schools at a cost of US$4.56 million, or an average of US$6,000 per school.

==== Mexico ====
According to CEO Telecom Briefings, Latin America 2009, Telmex considers that the goal to connect 15 million to broadband by 2012 is impossible. This is reportedly one of the administration's goals. The Government also hopes that by that date 70 million people will be able to connect to the Internet. According to data from INEGI, 20% of the population had access to the Internet.

Mexico presented the AgendaDigital.mx in 2012 establishing goals to increase fixed and mobile broadband penetration to 38% by 2015.

In June 2013 a reform Telecommunications was adopted establishing access to broadband and Internet as a constitutional right. The Reform also includes connectivity goals such as connecting at least 70% of Mexican households and 85% of SME's with the average OECD countries connection speed at competitive prices. As part of this reform the past regulator, the Comisión Federal de Telecomunicaciones (COFETEL) created by presidential decree in 1996 is to be replaced by a newly created organism the Insitituto Federal de Telecomunicaciones. (IFT).

COFETEL, now IFT, went from being a division of the Ministry of Communications and Transport (SCT) to become an independent constitutional body, the number of commissioners increased from five to seven and the selection of the commissioners changed. Previously, commissioners were appointed by the president with Senate approval. Under the recent Reform, the commissioners are elected by an Evaluation Committee who proposes a list of candidates that meet specific requirements established by law to the Executive, who selects a candidate(s) to be ratified by the Senate. In terms of financing, COFETEL depended on the allocation of a resources by the Ministry of Finance which limited its independent operation. The new IFT exercises its budget autonomously, according to the law 'the House will ensure the adequacy budget to enable the effective and timely exercise of its powers' (Article 28 LFT, 2013).

== Europe ==
=== European Union ===
The Digital Agenda for Europe is one of the seven flagship initiatives of the Europe 2020 strategy. The objective is to bring "basic broadband" to all Europeans by 2013 and also to ensure that, by 2020, all Europeans have access to much higher internet speeds of above 30 Mbit/s and 50% or more of European households subscribe to internet connections above 100 Mbit/s.

On 20 September 2010 the European Commission published a Broadband Communication, which describes measures the commission will take to achieve the targets of the Digital Agenda.

==== Austria ====
In October 2009, the European Commission called on the Austrian telecommunications regulator, RTR, to suspend the adoption of regulatory measures governing the broadband access market, finding that RTR provided "insufficient evidence" that mobile broadband connections can be considered substitutes for fixed-line DSL (digital subscriber line) and cable modem connections. RTR had proposed to define the broadband access market for residential customers as including mobile, DSL, and cable modem connections and to consider that market as competitive. RTR allegedly found that the retail broadband market for business customers was not competitive and that wholesale regulation of the market, including requiring "bitstream access", remained necessary. The EC disputed the conclusion that mobile connections are substitutes for fixed-line broadband connections, which would require that all three types of connections can be equally used for downloading music or films or providing sufficiently secure connections for Internet banking. The EC also questioned the definition of the relevant wholesale product market "as a sufficiently detailed forward-looking analysis of the different wholesale inputs is missing."

Previously, in 2003, the Campaign for Broadband Internet Connection initiative was launched, seeking to achieve blanket broadband by 2007. Information is scarce on whether the campaign was continued since the 2007 has come and passed without their goals being met.

==== Belgium ====
The Belgian government owns over 50% of the incumbent telco provider Belgacom.

As of April 2009, at the request of BIPT (the Belgian Institute for Postal service and Telecommunications), the consultancy firms Analysys Mason and Hogan & Hartson has drawn up a report regarding the development of the broadband market in Belgium and suggested a certain number of possible actions to promote competition on this market.

At the request of Mr Vincent van Quickenborne, Minister of Enterprise and Simplification, the suggested action items have been submitted to the sector for consultation.

According to the 2017 statistics, there are still 12% of the houses in Belgium that have broadband services with a bandwidth of less than 30 Mbit/s. Proximus has started to deploy Hybrid Access Networks by combining XDSL and LTE to address this problem.

==== Bulgaria ====
In March 2009, the "National Program for Development of Broadband Access in Republic of Bulgaria", issued by the State Agency for Information Technologies and Communication, set the following targets by the year 2013:

- 100% coverage of population at 10 Mbit/s in large cities
- 90% coverage of population at 6 Mbit/s in medium cities
- 30% coverage of population at 1 Mbit/s in rural areas (90% mobile broadband)

==== Croatia ====
The Government of the Republic of Croatia adopted on 13 October 2006 the Strategy for the development of broadband access to the Internet in the Republic of Croatia until 2008. The Strategy aims to reduce the gap between Croatia and European Union member states concerning the density level (penetration) of broadband Internet connections. Therefore, an ambitious goal has been set to achieve the density level of at least 12 percent, i.e. to number at least 500,000 broadband connections until the end of 2008. In January 2009, the government declared success. However, accepting the fact that in the area of the development of broadband Internet, new challenges stand before the Republic of Croatia. The Ministry of the Sea, Transport and Infrastructure and the Central State Administrative Office for e-Croatia have initiated the drafting of the new Strategy for the development of broadband access to the Internet which would define strategic goals for the forthcoming period.

==== Czech Republic ====
To speed up the broadband network development and stimulate its use mainly by households and individuals, the Government adopted the "National Broadband Access Policy" in January 2005. The Policy is based on the OECD Council recommendations on promoting broadband development. Its main goal for the CR is to achieve a level of about 50% of the population to use broadband by 2010 at the latest.

==== Denmark ====
The existing strategy for the rollout and use of broadband in Denmark is based on the 2001 broadband plan 'From hardware to content'. The Danish Government follows up this strategy annually. According to a hearing in 2005, Denmark will continue to follow the main principles of the strategy.

The political objective of the Danish Government is high transmission capacity for all, and strategies such as a national infrastructure that is rapid, inexpensive and secure, are needed to achieve this objective. The rollout of the IT infrastructure shall be developed by the private market with the Danish public sector serving as the driving force. For example, own IT investments by the public sector are intended to boost the demand for a digital infrastructure.

==== Estonia ====
The Estonian Information Society Strategy 2013 and the Estonian Electronic Communications Act reflect the basic principles of encouraging infrastructure investment, practicing technologically neutral policy and regulation and the primary role of the private sector in the expansion of broadband.

==== Finland ====
On 8 May 2008, Ms Suvi Lindén, Minister of Communications, appointed Mr Harri Pursiainen, permanent secretary, to study the means of ensuring a comprehensive broadband supply throughout the country and of organising its funding especially in non-built-up areas. The first part of the study includes a proposal for a government resolution and the second part examines the reasoning behind the proposal topic by topic. The report proposes that the public sector introduce business subsidies to enterprises that upgrade the public telecommunications network into a condition that makes available to most all citizens by 2015 an optical fibre or cable network supporting 100 Mbit connections. Prior to this goal, the speed of the broadband connection included in the universal service obligation must be raised to an average of 1 Mbit/s by 31 December 2010 at the latest.

In order to finance the State contribution required for the target for 2015, it is proposed that certain radio frequencies coming up for allocation be auctioned. In the event that auction revenues are insufficient to cover the State's public aid for telecommunications infrastructure construction, the shortfall would be made up with a telecommunications network compensatory payment to be collected from telecommunications operators. The auction revenues and the compensatory payments could be entered as income and decisions on their use made either through the Budget or by means of a fund outside the Budget.

Finland has passed a law making access to broadband a legal right for Finnish citizens. When the law went into effect in July 2010, every person in Finland, which has a population of around 5.3 million, will have the guaranteed right to a one-megabit broadband connection, says the Ministry of Transport and Communications The project was on track thanks especially to a huge uptake of mobile broadband. The guarantee increases to 10, 100 and 1 gigabit connections on fixed dates, a unique guarantee in the world.

Energy-efficient datacentres, accounting for "0.5 to 1.5 per cent of total electricity consumption in Finland", which capture "heat generated by datacentres [to feed] it into district heating networks, and "a research programme on environmental monitoring and services" to "create new tools, standards and methods for environmental measurement, monitoring and decision-making... based on environmental data to improve the energy and material efficiency of infrastructures and industrial processes" were major goals of public research projects related to the broadband initiatives.

==== France ====
On 20 October 2008 the French Government announced sweeping measures to make France a leading digital economy by 2012. The plan outlines a strategy that the government will follow in the coming years to make France a leading digital economy. While some of the measures are obviously aimed at helping French companies, foreign companies will be able to benefit from the plan simply by creating a French subsidiary or by entering into strategic agreements with French companies or universities. The new plan will create opportunities for telecommunications operators, equipment manufacturers, content providers, web-based delivery platforms, game and software publishers, and universities in France.

==== Germany ====
In February 2009, the second Merkel cabinet approved a "broadband strategy" with stated aims of accelerating telecommunication and internet connectivity, closing gaps in underserved areas by the end of 2010, and ensuring nationwide access to high speed internet by 2014. Policy actions include upgrades to existing broadband infrastructure over the short term by deploying the entire range of feasible technologies – whether cable, fiber optics, satellite, or wireless – and utilizing the digital dividend resulting from frequencies no longer needed for broadcasting following digitalization. Accordingly, the regulatory agency Federal Network Agency held a digital dividend spectrum auction in April through May 2010. The auctioned spectrum in the 800 MHz frequency band was sold to three of the four national mobile operators (Deutsche Telekom, Vodafone Germany, and O_{2}) and is used to provide LTE service.

After the 2013 federal election, the coalition agreement which led to the third Merkel cabinet included a goal to provide "nationwide coverage" of at least 50 Mbit/s internet access by 2018 through means of encouraging investments, reducing investment barriers and setting appropriate regulatory frameworks.

==== Greece ====
The governmental FTTH plan of 2M homes passed absolutely reasonable despite what has been said so far by some about the necessity of such an investment in terms of scale and scope.

==== Ireland ====
The National Broadband Scheme (NBS) aimed to encourage and secure the provision of broadband services to targeted areas in Ireland in which broadband services are not currently available and are unlikely to be available in the near future. Following a broadband coverage mapping exercise to identify underserved areas and a competitive tendering process, a contract was awarded to "3" (a Hutchison Whampoa company) in December 2008, to implement and operate the NBS. Under the contract, 3 will be required to provide services to all premises in the NBS area that want service. In order to facilitate competition, 3 also will be required to provide wholesale access to any other authorized operator who wishes to serve the NBS area.

The National Broadband Plan is a 7-year plan by the Irish Government to deliver fiber broadband to non-commercially viable rural areas of Ireland. The contract was signed in 2019, with a start date in January 2020.

==== Latvia ====
In 2006 and 2007, Latvia carried out several small projects to increase internet access in Latvian provinces and a single major-scale project to increase broadband access in rural areas. The projects were implemented and co-financed by local governments and the central government, with the majority of the funding provided by EU structural funds. Latvia has listed internet access and availability promotion as an activity eligible for EU structural funds for the 2007–2013 EU budgetary period, but this activity is not designed to target rural areas or specifically increase broadband deployment. However, given Latvia's severe economic decline and the associated budgetary issues, the outlook for additional projects in the future is grim.

Falling budget revenues have significantly limited Latvia's ability to co-finance any EU projects. There are bureaucratic obstacles as well, since Latvia has not yet adopted guidelines and evaluation criteria necessary to launch this program. One reason behind this delay is the GOL plan to reprioritize the national list of activities eligible for EU money in response to the crisis, increasing funding to the export sector. Internet access is not viewed by Latvian authorities as a significant problem; therefore, an increase in funding to communication infrastructure projects is unlikely. Furthermore, Latvia has decided to divert the funds the European Commission allocated to expansion of broadband networks, as part of the European Economic Recovery Plan, to projects in the dairy sector.

==== Lithuania ====
Rural Area Information Technology (RAIN) project
002 project

The Development Strategy of the Broadband Infrastructure of Lithuania for 2005–2010 was published in the official gazette on 31 December 2002. The Strategy goals are as follows: to create conditions for public administration institutions, bodies and individuals to obtain broadband access; to promote competition in the field of the Internet access provision on the market using public and private capital investments; to seek that the national social and economic growth would be influenced; to reduce the exclusion of the population in the territory of the country.

When connecting public administration institutions and bodies to the broadband networks and creating an opportunity for small and medium-sized enterprises as well as the population to use the broadband infrastructure and e-services all over the country's territory (especially in peripheral/uncompetitive locations where the level of use and development of wideband connection services is low), the following assessment criteria are important:

1. By 1 January 2007 in 50% of the country's territory to create an opportunity to connect to the available broadband networks for all small and medium-sized enterprises willing to do so as well as the population and to connect at least 40% of public administration institutions and bodies (i.e. educational institutions, libraries, health care institutions and bodies, etc.) to the broadband networks.
2. By 1 January 2008 in 50% of the country's territory to create an opportunity to connect to the available broadband networks for all small and medium-sized enterprises willing to do so as well as the population and to connect at least 60% of public administration institutions and bodies to the wideband connection networks.
3. By 1 January 2009 to connect 100% of public administration institutions and bodies (except for some diplomatic representations of the RepublicofLithuania abroad) to the broadband networks.
4. By 1 January 2010 in 98% of the country's territory to create an opportunity to connect to the available broadband networks for all small and medium-sized enterprises willing to do so as well as the population.

==== Netherlands ====
Nederland BreedbandLand (NBL) is the independent national platform for the provision of aid and incentives to the social sectors for the 'better and smarter' use of broadband.

==== Poland ====
Newspaper Gazeta Wyborcza writes that the Polish government has drafted a new law regulating broadband network deployments and will put it to a parliamentary vote in late October or early November. The law would, for example, require every multiresidential house in the country from 2010 to be connected with fibre, define rules for local governments to invest in broadband in areas that are not viable for commercial roll-outs, as well as set a framework for using utility infrastructure to accommodate network equipment. If approved as planned, the legislation could become effective as of January 2010.

Significance

The new regulations are part of the government's broadband strategy, which aims at bringing 100% of Poland's households and businesses within the coverage of broadband infrastructure by 2013 or 2014, partially using European Union (EU) funding (Note: See Poland: 2 April 2009: Polish Government Plans to Direct 300 mil. Euro to Broadband Expansion.) In the meantime, telecoms regulator UKE is also in discussions with the local incumbent, TP, over the company's mid-term capex strategy, trying to agree on an investment level that would contribute to the goals of the national broadband strategy. In order to boost the investment, the UKE has softened some of its policies upon the incumbent, most significantly in regard with vertical separation, which it has put on hold for the time being, and wholesale access fees, which it has reportedly offered to freeze for the next couple of years.

==== Portugal ====
In January 2009, Portugal's government announced an 800-million-euro credit line for the roll-out of next-generation broadband networks in the country. Prime Minister José Sócrates announced the funding, saying he hoped the country's main telecoms operators would invest one billion euro to build NGNs during 2009. The credit line forms part of an agreement between the government and the operators Portugal Telecom, ZON Multimédia, Sonaecom, and ONI on the roll-out of fibre networks, and is the first step in a 2.18-billion-euro plan announced in December 2008 to boost the country's economy.

Prime Minister Socrates said the credit line would pave the way for improvements in high-speed internet, television and voice services, adding: "This is the launch of the first measure of the stimulus plan to combat the economic crisis."

Development Through Fibre

Portugal's PM said he hoped the investment would allow up to 1.5 million homes and businesses to be connected to the new fibre networks. He added that the government has no preference regarding how the networks are rolled out by the operators, leaving them to reach a decision among themselves on whether single or multiple networks are constructed. Although the terms of the credit line have not been disclosed, they are likely to be highly favourable to the operators, and may represent a timely cash injection—as the global economic crisis bites, operator spending in reined in and private investment sources dry up. Portugal's broadband market showed strong growth, not least due to widespread cable and DSL networks. ADSL2+ services are also available from alternative operators such as Vodafone and cable data speeds at up to 100 Mbit/s were trialled in 2007. The Portuguese government had set a goal of 50% home broadband penetration by 2010, and this latest investment should allow the operators to significantly surpass this target.

==== Romania ====
In May 2009, while broadband Internet access increased by 30 percent last year, Romania's penetration rate is still half that of the EU average. Both the newly reorganized National Authority for Administration and Regulations in Communications (ANCOM) and the renamed Ministry of Communication and Information Society (MCIS) have repeatedly expressed interest in further expanding broadband access. To this end, MCIS issued a new broadband strategy for 2009 to 2015, but has yet to identify how to implement or fund the strategy. This cable responds to Department's reftel request for information on country broadband deployment initiatives.

In his first press conference on 9 April, new ANCOM President Catalin Marinescu stated his main goal would be to increase the number of broadband Internet connections. Due to the expansion of the 3G network, mobile access connections to the Internet reached 2.7 million users in 2008, which is almost double the number in 2007. Despite a 30 percent increase in access in 2008, Romania's broadband penetration is still only about 11.7 percent, which is less than half of the EU average of 22.9 percent.

ANCOM suggestions for increasing broadband deployment in Romania include:

1. Review local loop access conditions that were unsuccessfully regulated in 2003;
2. stimulate operators with existing 3G licenses to expand services and/or reorganize the 3G band in order to grant one or two additional licenses to companies (there are currently four 3G licensed operators in Romania);
3. reissue a WiMax tender for the 3.5–3.7 GHz band. A 2008 attempt to grant WiMax licenses failed due to the high cost. ANCOM hopes the Government will lower the cost in order to increase commercial interest in the coming year.

A precondition for accessing EU structural funds in this area is the adoption of a national broadband strategy. The MCIS's 2009–2015 strategy for broadband wireless access establishes an inter-ministerial working group responsible for implementation of infrastructure projects for broadband service expansion. Additionally, Minister of Communication Gabriel Sandu claims he will identify other financing sources, such as crisis funds, governmental funds and private funds to increase broadband deployment to rural areas.

==== Slovenia ====
In 2004, Slovenia issued the Strategy for Development of Broadband Networks, effective 2004–2006. The main principles included:

1. The primary role of the market and competition in broadband development;
2. formulating measures to activate the public sector, especially where private sector interest is lacking;
3. expanding broadband connections in public administration and stimulating e-government services;
4. stimulating competition between different types of infrastructure and services.

Slovenia is preparing a new strategy for development of broadband networks, which will focus on simulating of private sector development of rural and scarcely populated areas.

==== Spain ====
Since 2005, the Ministry of Industry, Tourism and Trade granted financial aids to operators to encourage their investment in areas where there would unlikely have been any broadband. Two main programmes composed the strategy to provide broadband access to rural and isolated areas:

- National Programme for Broadband roll-out in rural and remote areas: PEBA (2005–2008)
- Avanza Infrastructures Programme (2008–2012)

To ensure the programme objectives, non-duplication of investments and non-distortion of competition, specific service and operative requirements were required by projects and beneficiary operators.

Service requirements consisted of providing broadband access with a minimum download speed and a maximum monthly fee. Additionally, the program operative requirements consisted of:

1. Technological neutrality so that any type of broadband technology could be deployed and to avoid technology obsolescence;
2. the duty of the beneficiaries to open up the financed networks to competition;
3. infrastructure investments in well-defined and not serviced areas in order to avoid duplicative investments.

Taking into account cabled technologies such as DSL are distance-sensitive, and generally only feasible within a few miles of the nearest central office switch, PEBA projects were not limited to a single technology. Several technological solutions (ADSL, WiMAX, Satellite and HFC) were used to provide broadband access to the PEBA population centres, depending on their geographic features, roll–out dates and available technology.

Following Peba achievements and within the Avanza Infrastructures Program, the Ministry continued working to increase broadband coverage in small population centres. Additionally and taken into account advances in technology and the need not only to provide broadband access but also to improve the service quality and speed, the objective was to improve bandwidth and network capacity provided by telcos in rural areas. Two actions compose the broadband strategy under this funding program:

F1: Projects intended to deploy access infrastructures in order to satisfy the demand for broadband connection for populations in isolated and rural areas.
F2: Projects intended to improve speed and capacity of rural backbone networks

F1 projects were based mainly on wireless broadband access technologies such as: HSDPA, WIMAX and satellite, though some of the beneficiary operators were already planning to provide ADSL connection at some population centres. F2 projects were mostly to improve transport networks by means of fibre optics and WiMAX radio links.

In October 2009, Spain's Ministry of Industry opened a consultation on extending the concept of universal service to cover broadband access. The consultation concerned topics such as minimum speed, use of wireless technologies for broadband provision, related pricing models, and the schedule for service implementation.

Significance

The mandate for universal service covers narrowband internet access, but as speeds of such services have become increasingly inadequate for responding to typical user needs, the government assessed whether connection over broadband should be defined as a legal right. According to regulator CMT, access defined as narrowband accounted for 2.4% of all 9.6 million internet subscriptions, against 5.2% a year earlier. For broadband access those at speeds below 1 Mbit/s represented 0.4% of the total. IHS Global Insight's view is that the allocation of lower frequency bands such as 800 and 900 MHz for data services will be the main solution if the Spanish government wants to bring broadband to every citizen. Incumbent Telefónica has used WiMAX and satellite connections to live up to its universal service mandate in some of the more remote areas, yet by expanding its mobile broadband network by using the lower frequencies it could achieve the same more cost-efficiently.

==== Sweden ====
The goal of Sweden's Information Technology Policy is that Sweden should be a sustainable information society for all. This implies an accessible information society with a modern infrastructure and IT services of public benefit, so as to simplify everyday life and give people in every part of the country a better quality of life.

People believe that IT should contribute to a better quality of life and help improve and simplify everyday life for people and companies, but it should also be used to promote sustainable growth. An effective and secure physical infrastructure for IT, with high transmission capacity, should be available in all parts of the country so as to give people access to, among other things, interactive public e-services.

For broadband, the Swedish and European IT policy aims to increase accessibility to an infrastructure with capacity for broadband transmission. Broadband among other things, promotes economic growth by creating new services and opening up new investment and employment opportunities. The objective is broadband for all households (permanent housing) and business and public operations. According to the Swedish Post and Telecom Authority, 'broadband' in this objective, refers to connections that can be upgraded to a transmission rate downstream of at least 2 Mb per second.

Between 2001 and 2007, Sweden's broadband support program included:

- Total state governmental funding 817 million $ (5.25 billion SEK)
- Total investment: Government 51%; Municipalities 11%; Operators 30%; EU structural funds 7%; Regional policy funds 1%
- Concentrating on rural and other areas where the market will not supply infrastructure
- Open procurement process
- Requirement that networks should be operator-neutral
- 85% of investments used for new infrastructure

=== Other European countries ===
==== Norway ====
According to the statement of the political platform for the parties in Government7 dated 13 October 2005, the level of ambition for broadband rollout is to rise. The rollout of broadband throughout the entire country offers great potential to the business sector in the form of development and the setting up of more businesses, while reducing the difficulties of great distances. The tangible objectives of Government policy include:

- Broadband should be available throughout Norway by the end of 2007
- Unreasonable geographical price differences for broadband connection should not exist
- Government funding will contribute to broadband rollout in those areas where rollout is not ensured by market players.

==== Russia ====
On 17 September 2009, Deputy Prime Minister Sergey Sobyanin has indicated that a special government commission will meet in October to discuss the development of broadband services in Russia, reports Prime-Tass. Issues to be considered will include the enhancement of broadband access quality and the increase of data-transfer speeds. Sobyanin also stated that the government would allocate 10 billion roubles (US$326.7 million) towards the development of various high-tech projects in 2010, aimed at carrying out technological upgrades in various sectors of the Russian economy. Earlier in the week Communications and Mass Media Minister Igor Shchyogolev stated that the government viewed the construction of main communications lines and the development of broadband and digital TV services as the top priorities of the telecoms industry.

Significance

The words of the deputy prime minister and communications minister highlight the importance with which the development of broadband services in the country is viewed. Broadband has taken over from mobile as the sector of highest growth potential in Russia, with the Communications Ministry reporting a fourfold increase in internet traffic in 2008. The market is heterogeneous, with no single dominant operator, but instead a number of players employing a variety of technologies. Although uptake has typically been centred on the economic hubs of the capital Moscow and St Petersburg, operators are increasingly expanding towards the regions for further opportunities. With operators continuing to invest in the broadband sector, subscriber uptake growing, and now increasing signals of interest from the government, IHS Global Insight expects the sector to continue to grow healthily in the short and medium terms.

==== Switzerland ====
On 7 October 2009, the Swiss Federal Office of Communications (ComCom) has revealed that round table discussions on the deployment of fibre-to-the-home (FTTH) networks are producing concrete results. According to the regulator the major players are now in agreement on uniform technical standards, meaning that there are no technical barriers to the rapid expansion of the fibre network. A consensus has also been reached on coordination, which will prevent the parallel construction of new networks by laying multiple fibres in every building (known as the multiple fibre model). At the same time the participants at the round table have agreed that all providers must have access to the fibre-optic network under the same conditions, so as to protect end-users' freedom of choice. The participants drew up further recommendations for standardised network access by services. Thanks to an open interface, service providers will enjoy network access to customers at all times via network operators. If, at a later date, the customer opts for a different service provider on the same fibre-optic network, the switch will be possible without any technical complications.

The roundtable discussions involve cable network operators, telecoms companies and electricity utilities. Further roundtables and working groups will be held to clarify points. ComCom will also examine whether new regulatory measures are needed to govern FTTH deployment, with the aim of reporting to parliament by mid-2010 at the latest.

==== United Kingdom ====
The United Kingdom issued its "Digital Britain" report in June 2009.

The Universal Service Commitment. More than one in 10 households today cannot enjoy a 2 Mbps connection. We will correct this by providing universal service by 2012. It has a measure of future-proofing so that, as the market deploys next-generation broadband, we do not immediately face another problem of exclusion. The USC is also a necessary step if we are to move towards digital switchover in the delivery of more and more of our public services. The Universal Service Commitment will be delivered by a mix of technologies: DSL, fibre to the street cabinet, wireless and possibly satellite infill. It will be funded from £200m from direct public funding, enhanced by five other sources: commercial gain through tender contract and design, contributions in kind from private partners, contributions from other public sector organisations in the nations and regions who benefit from the increased connectivity, the consumer directly for in-home upgrading, and the value of wider coverage obligations on mobile operators arising from the wider mobile spectrum package. The Commitment will be delivered through the Network Design and Procurement Group, with a CEO appointed in the Autumn. We will also discuss with the BBC Trust the structure which gives them appropriate visibility in the delivery process of the use being made of the Digital Switchover Help Scheme underspend, which will be realised in full by 2012.

The Next Generation Final Third project. Next generation broadband networks offer not just conventional high definition video entertainment and games (which because of this country's successful satellite platform are less significant drivers here than in some other markets) but also more revolutionary applications. These will include tele-presence, allowing for much more flexible working patterns, e-healthcare in the home and for small businesses the increasing benefits of access to cloud computing which substantially cuts costs and allows much more rapid product and service innovation. Next-generation broadband will enable innovation and economic benefits we cannot today predict. First generation broadband provided a boost to GDP of some 0.5%–1.0% a year. In recent months the UK has seen an energetic, market-led roll-out of next generation fixed broadband. By this Summer [2009] speeds of 50 Mbps and above will be available to all households covered by the Virgin Media Ltd's national cable network: some 50% of UK homes. Following decisions by the regulator, Ofcom, which have enhanced regulatory certainty, BT Group plc has been encouraged by the first year capital allowances measures in Budget 2009 and the need to respond competitively to accelerate their plans for the mix of fibre to the cabinet and fibre to the home. BT's enhanced network will cover the first 1,000,000 homes in their network. The £100m Yorkshire Digital Region programme approved in Budget 2009 will also provide a useful regional testbed for next generation digital networks.

In August 2009 the UK Government published its Digital Britain Implementation Plan setting out the government's roadmap for the rollout of its plans mentioned above.

== Africa ==
=== Botswana ===
Following the further liberalization of the Botswana telecommunications sector in 2004, the Government embarked on a new licensing structure in 2006. That action was designed to move the country from the pre-existing licensing framework, which made the distinction between the various telecoms services, to a service-neutral structure with the view of accommodating technological convergence.

Currently, the only operator offering fixed-line broadband services is state-owned Botswana Telecommunications Corporation (BTC), which has launched ADSL services. However, the larger ISPs are also rolling out broadband wireless networks, mainly in Gaborone (the capital), to serve corporate customers in particular. Mobile operator Orange launched its broadband wireless service in June 2008 using a WiMAX network in Gaborone. The total number of broadband subscribers increased to an estimated 3,500 in 2007, up from 1,800 in 2006 and 1,600 in 2005, with broadband comprising a growing proportion of total internet accounts.

BTC offers a range of data services including Frame Relay, ISDN, ADSL, MPLS and a broadband wireless service known as Wireless FastConnect. The data market has been liberalized, with ISPs now holding value-added network service (VANS) provider licenses. BTC enjoyed a monopoly over international bandwidth until February 2001 when the regulator began issuing international data gateway licenses. BTC's international bandwidth reached the 200-Mbit/s mark during 2008, some 90% of which (180 Mbit/s) was supplied via cross-border fiber networks to neighboring countries and 10% (20 Mbit/s) by satellite.

During 2004, BTC began the deployment of ADSL and a domestic two-way VSAT network for areas beyond the reach of terrestrial infrastructure.

During September 2008, BTC completed the roll-out of the Trans-Kalahari fiber-optic project, connecting Botswana to the neighboring countries of Namibia and Zambia. The 2,000-kilometre system was built in three parts: phase 1 runs from Jwaneng through Ghanzi to Mamuno (the border with Namibia); phase 2 runs from Ghanzi via Maun to Orapa; and the phase 3 runs from Sebina via Nata, Kasane to Ngoma (the border with Zambia). The network is designed to provide onward connectivity to submarine cables, removing the dependence on transiting through South Africa to reach the Sat-3/WASC and S.A.F.E (Southern Africa Far East) submarine cable systems.

BTC is a signatory to three submarine cable projects (EASSy, WAFS and AWCC) and the government is in tripartite discussions with Angola and Namibia to assist each other in realizing the most effective means of achieving connectivity to these cable systems:

- East Africa Submarine System (EASSy), which will run along the eastern coast of Africa from Port Sudan (Sudan) to Mtunzini (South Africa) via Mombasa (Kenya), Dar es Salaam (Tanzania) and Maputo (Mozambique).
- West Africa Festoon System (WAFS), the planned cable that will run along the western coast of Africa from Nigeria through Gabon, Democratic Republic of the Congo, Angola and possibly Namibia.
- Africa West Coast Cable (AWCC), planned to run along the western coast of Africa from South Africa and Namibia to the United Kingdom. The proposed AWCC was replaced by the West Africa Submarine Cable (WASC), which awarded a supply contract to Alcatel-Lucent in April 2009.

=== Egypt ===
Broadband access, mainly the DSL variety, is still in its infancy. Local loop unbundling for DSL access was introduced in April 2002 to kick-start broadband uptake, but real growth occurred only after a government initiative in May 2004 that mandated a 50% tariff cut for unbundling. As part of the government's e-Readiness initiative, a strategy of public-private partnership is being aggressively pursued in the Internet sector to accelerate Internet and broadband uptake.

=== Ghana ===
On 23 July 2009, the government of Ghana has signed a US$150 million contract with Chinese equipment manufacturer Huawei Technologies for the supply of advanced telecoms infrastructure to ensure broadband internet access countrywide within the next two years. The Minister of Communications, Haruna Iddrisu, told delegates at a conference on Business process outsourcing (BPO) that the infrastructure would link internet Point of Presence (POP) in all district capitals under the government's ICT Backbone Development Programme. The minister added that the government was committed to ensuring it developed the human resources needed to promote the country as a prospect for BPO companies, and said Ghana was working hard to ensure the legislative regime was right encourage inward investment under the e-legislation programme. 'During the year the Ministry of Communications will also facilitate the development of additional legislations in the area of data protection and intellectual property for investors in the area of data capturing and management to operate within the confines of international guidelines and rules,' he said. His words were echoed by Vice President John Dramani Mahama who stressed Ghana's commitment to developing the nation's ICT backbone capabilities. 'In addition to the SAT3 connectivity, GLO-1 and MaiOne will commence the construction of two additional landing stations by the end of this year to take care of the issues of bandwidth redundancy,' he said.

In May 2007, the government of Ghana launched the "Wiring Ghana" project, a $250 million nationwide 4,000 kilometer fiber-optic backbone project that promises to dramatically increase Ghana's broadband bandwidth supply, reportedly to a capacity of STM-16 nationwide. The government's goal is to provide an open-access, nationwide broadband connectivity to boost economic development. As of May 2008, Phase I of the project that covers the south and mid-country had been completed. Rollout of the second and final phase is underway and is slated to be completed by December 2009.

Ghana's project will also provide fiber-optic connections with the neighboring countries of Burkina Faso to the north and Togo to the east.

Ghana's broadband market, divided between ADSL and wireless broadband services, was small at the end of 2008, a total of about 26,500 subscribers, ADSL 53% and wireless WiFi/WiMax 47%.

=== Kenya ===
In May 2009, Kenya will revolutionize its telecom industry when it initiates its first fiber optic internet connection on 27 June. This broadband connection will vastly improve the quality of internet access to Kenya and contiguous landlocked countries. With increased internet capacity, the fiber will improve local bandwidth quality and potentially decrease communication costs, as it complements the existing and widely used satellite communication networks. The increased bandwidth capabilities will improve the competitiveness of existing businesses, create growth in new industries such as knowledge-based businesses and business process outsourcing, and significantly increase access to information for end-users, schools, and universities. The Government of Kenya (GOK) expects foreign investment in the sector to hit $10 billion in 2009. Septel will report how this connection and other broadband initiatives will affect rural and underserved areas.

From Patrick Boateng's June 2009 report: on broadband, the Kenyan government has recently taken several steps to boost the country's future international bandwidth by committing to several planned submarine cable projects. As an example, in September 2006, Kenya's cabinet decided, after further delays to the proposed East African Submarine Cable System (EASSy), to proceed with its plan to build its own submarine cable, the East Africa Marine System (TEAMS) Ltd. In November 2006, the government signed a memorandum of understanding (MoU) with UAE's fixed-line incumbent, Etisalat, to build a submarine cable from Mombasa to Al Fujairah in the UAE. In a February 2007 Kenyan government contract award to U.S. Company, Tyco Telecommunications, the company conducted an undersea survey for the project. In October 2007, after the completion of the marine survey, Alcatel-Lucent won the bid to build the cable, and service is expected to begin at the end of the third quarter 2009.

In 2008, Kenya adopted a National ICT Policy and enacted the Kenya Communications Amendment Act. Backed by a new ICT Sector Master Plan (2008–2012) and a projected budget of $812.5 million, the main goals of this move are to develop regulations that will provide an enabling environment for leveraging the new broadband capacity, and to improve the ICT sector in general.

Meanwhile, a third submarine cable funded by South African and other investors, Sea Cable System (SEACOM), landed in Mombasa in May 2009 and is expected to be operational by July 2009. EASSy is slowly in progress and is expected to land in Mombasa in 2010. Also on the horizon are two additional submarine cables, Orange's Lion which will run from Mombasa to Madagascar to Mauritius and Reunion; and FLAG Telecom NGN System II cable.

=== Nigeria ===
In 2009, the Nigerian Communications Commission (NCC) partnered with Nigerian WiMAX operator ipNX to bring broadband access to all 36 states in the country through the 'State Accelerated Bandwidth Initiative' (SABI). The project had been long-delayed, having been postponed because of government red tape and a lack of budget.

The subsidies were limited to:

1. CPEs for the first 3,000 subscribers per city. (to enable a critical mass for each city sustainable network)
2. Bandwidth supply for the first one year.

Three providers were selected and approved by the Federal Government: IPNX, MTN, and NAIJA-WIFI. The introduction of a unified licensing regime from 2006 had far-reaching consequences by increasing the scope of the operating licenses of different fixed-line and mobile operators.

At least two Nigerian ISPs expanded services into other countries in West Africa. Intercellular, one of the PTOs, was granted a license to operate in Sierra Leone. It also applied for licenses in Benin, Chad, Guinea, Liberia, and Mali. Meanwhile, Hyperia, a Nigerian ISP, launched two new wireless broadband services: a new WiMAX service in Port Harcourt and a two-way broadband VSAT service. Hyperia awarded a contract to Navini Networks, and launched the 3.5 GHz WiMAX service in Port Harcourt. The ISP also awarded a contract to Gilat Satellite Networks, to provide a SkyEdge broadband satellite hub and several hundred VSAT terminals. The VSAT network uses both C band and K_{u} band, and its hub and was deployed at Hyperia's network operations center in London (U.K.). The VSAT network enabled Hyperia to expand its services in West Africa.

Transmission networks are the crux for the Nigerian telecommunications sector. Mobile operators, fixed-wireless access (FWA) operators, and ISPs require a robust national transmission backbone to link base stations, mobile switches, and POPs together with long-haul upstream bandwidth. In the absence of a reliable backbone, satellite has provided transmission and backhaul capacity, as well as international connectivity. NITEL has access to Sat-3/WASC and is gradually upgrading its national transmission capacity. Globacom launched its "Glo Xpress" long-distance transmission service in 2005.

The regulator Nigerian Communications Commission (NCC) liberalized the long-distance market, and in addition to the two national carriers, there are seven national long-distance operator (NLDOs). The mobile operators have also deployed their own independent national fiber and microwave backbones, and the unified access license granted to the mobile operators would allow them to commercialize these backbones. A key factor has been the entry of foreign operators into this market, through the acquisition of Nigerian operators.

Much of Nigeria's international bandwidth is provided by satellite. Six submarine cables that would land in Nigeria. Following is a list of key broadband networks:

- National Carriers: Both national fixed-line operators NITEL and Globacom, and leading national mobile operators, MTN and Zain, rolled out their own fiber-optic network infrastructure.
- Alheri Engineering Co Ltd: Alheri Engineering, which was awarded one of the 3G licenses.
- Backbone Connectivity Network Ltd (BCN): BCN began the roll-out of fiber backbone in the northern states of Nigeria in 2006.
- Multi-Links Telecommunications Co Ltd (MLTC): Multi-Links, which was acquired by South African incumbent Telkom SA in March 2007, has a fiber backbone running from Lagos to Abuja. Multi-links had deployed some 2,500 kilometers of fiber-optic network by 2008, completed a metro Ethernet ring in Lagos.
- Phase3 Telecom: Phase3 Telecom won a 15-year concession in March 2006 to operate the fiber-optic cables strung over the high-voltage electricity transmission network of the Power Holding Company of Nigeria (PHCN) in the west of the country.
- Suburban Telecoms: Suburban Telecoms formed a joint venture with Ocean and Oil Holdings (OOH) Ltd to deploy a fiber MAN along a gas pipeline.
- Victoria Garden City Communications Ltd (VGC Communications): VGC had a customer base of 20,000 in 2007, and operates a fiber MAN in Lagos, where it has laid some 120 kilometers of fiber-optic cables connecting the suburb of Victoria Garden City with Victoria Island, Ikoyi, Ikeja, Marina, Costain, and MayfairGardens.
- Submarine Cables: In addition to the Sat-3/WASC submarine cable that lands at Lagos, contracts were awarded for at least two more cables.
- Glo-1: Globacom, the SNO and mobile operator, announced in August 2008 that its Glo-1 submarine cable, which will run from the United Kingdom to Lagos and Port Harcourt (Nigeria), was "nearing completion" and would be finished by May 2009.
- Main-1: Main Street Technologies, a Nigerian company, announced in April 2008 that it had awarded a supply contract to Tyco Telecommunications to build its Main One submarine cable. The 14,000-kilometre cable has a capacity of 1.28 Tbit/s.
- Other submarine cables: At least five other cables were planned to land in Nigeria. The Africa West Coast Cable (AWCC) would run from South Africa to Europe via Nigeria, the West African Festoon System (WAFS) would run from Angola to Nigeria, connecting those countries that do not have Sat-3 landing points, the Infinity Worldwide Group of Companies planned a West African cable that would include Nigeria, NEPAD planned a cable, called Uhurunet, which would encircle the whole continent and have a landing point in Nigeria, and the proposed ACE (Africa Coast to Europe) cable would run from Gabon to France via Nigeria and 19 other African countries.

=== South Africa ===
The government passed the Electronic Communications Act in 2006 and restructured the sector towards a converged framework, converting vertically integrated licenses previously granted to PSTN, mobile, USAL, PTN and VANS operators into Electronic Communications Network Services (ECNS), Electronic Communications Services (ECS), or broadcasting licenses. In 2009, the Independent Communications Authority of South Africa (ICASA) granted ECS and ECNS licenses to 500 VANS operators. Licenses are also required for radio frequency spectrum, except for low power devices. ICASA granted ECNS licenses during 2007 to seven new under-serviced area licenses (USAL) operators. The licensees include PlatiTel, Ilembe Communications, Metsweding Telex, Dinaka Telecoms, Mitjodi Telecoms, and Nyakatho Telecoms.

South Africa had an estimated 6 million internet users in 2008 and the number of fixed (wireless and wireline) broadband subscribers is estimated at 750,000. Telkom reported 491,774 ADSL subscribers (Q3 2008), with the remainder using wireless broadband networks. South Africa's total international bandwidth reached the 10 Gbit/s mark during 2008, and its increase was driven primarily by the uptake of broadband and lowering of tariffs. The South African market is split into two main tiers: top-tier internet access providers; and downstream retail ISPs. ISPs are licensed as value-added network service (VANS) providers, although under the Electronic Communications Act of 2006, these licenses were converted in 2009 to individual or class electronic communication service (ECS) licenses. All domestic ISPs gain international connectivity through one of the internet access providers: SAIX (Telkom), Neotel, Verizon Business, The Internet Solution, MTN Network Solutions, DataPro and Posix Systems.

Following the deregulation of the VANS industry in South Africa, a number of leading operators have diversified from being a top-tier ISP to becoming a converged communications service provider offering a range of voice and data services, particularly voice over IP, through the conversion of VANS licenses into ECS licenses.

With delays to local loop unbundling (LLU), which would give ISPs access to exchanges, operators are deploying a range of broadband wireless networks. While the mobile operators are deploying HSDPA, W-CDMA and EDGE networks and entering the broadband space, operators are also deploying WiMAX, iBurst, and CDMA systems. Telkom, Sentech, Neotel, WBS and the under-serviced areas licensees (USALs) have currently been given commercial WiMAX licenses. Telkom launched full commercial WiMAX services in 2007, first at 14 sites in Pretoria, Cape Town and Durban. Another 10 operators, including M-Web and Vodacom, were granted temporary test licenses and are awaiting spectrum to be allocated by ICASA. In 2008, WBS partnered with Vodacom and Intel Corporation to roll out an 802.16e WiMAX network.

South Africa was served by two submarine cables: SAT-2 and the SAT-3/WASC/SAFE system. Contracts were awarded for the following three additional submarine cables from 2009:

- SEACOM: The SEACOM submarine cable landing at Mombasa was due to enter commercial service in 2009. The cable runs from South Africa to Egypt via Mozambique, Madagascar, Tanzania, Kenya, Djibouti and Saudi Arabia, connecting eastwards through to India and westwards through the Mediterranean.
- East African Submarine Cable System (EASSy): From South Africa (Mtunzini) to Egypt via Mombasa (Kenya) and other East African countries. The cable was due to run as far north as Djibouti and Port Sudan, with onward connectivity to Europe provide by the Europe India Gateway (EIG) cable. In 2007, a 23-member consortium behind EASSy signed a supply contract with Alcatel-Lucent.
- West African Cable System (WACS). In 2009, the WACS consortium signed a construction and maintenance agreement, and awarded a supply contract to Alcatel-Lucent for a 14,000-kilometre cable to provide connectivity between South Africa, Portugal and the United Kingdom via 11 other African countries. With a minimum design capacity of 3.84 Terabit/s, WACS connects South Africa to the UK with landings in 12 countries: Namibia, Angola, DRC, Congo, Cameroon, Nigeria, Togo, Ghana, Côte d'Ivoire, Cape Verde, the Canary Islands, and Portugal. The WACS consortium comprises 11 parties: Angola Telecom, Broadband Infraco (see below), Cable & Wireless, MTN, Portugal Telecom, Sotelco, Tata Communications, Telecom Namibia, Telkom SA, Togo Telecom and Vodacom. The cable was expected to be ready for service during 2011.

=== Uganda ===
On 13 October 2009, Uganda's ICT Minister Aggrey Awori announces the establishment of the Uganda Broadband Infrastructure Strategy Team (UBIST). The team he said comprises representatives from Government, Regulator, Operators, Internet Service Providers, Other investors/consumers, Civil Society and academia. UBIST will provide government with a well informed position for enabling it to access International Broadband Infrastructure. The government is also studying a number of policies for the effective implementation of the National Broadband strategy.

== Asia ==
=== Hong Kong, S.A.R. of China ===
The Digital 21 Strategy was first published in 1998 by the Government of the Hong Kong Special Administrative Region to set out its vision of developing Hong Kong into a leading digital city. It was updated in 2001, 2004 and 2008. The 2008 edition states that Hong Kong has among the most affordable Internet and mobile phone services in the world, with some of the highest penetration rates. Cyberport and Hong Kong Science Park were developed as hubs for information and communications technology (ICT) companies. The Strategy also covers an e-government program and calls for participation from the ICT industry, businesses, academia and the public. It says key indicators of ICT development will be measured and tracked over time. The Office of the Government Chief Information Officer (OGCIO) coordinates implementation within the government and tracks progress annually.

=== India ===
The typical speeds for consumer broadband connections in India vary from 512 kbit/s to 12 Mbit/s, with speeds of up to 100 Mbit/s available in a few areas (mostly on university campuses), though plans of 8–16 Mbit/s and above are becoming more common from BSNL, Airtel, Beam Telecom, Reliance and MTNL, but they are expensive and out of reach of most Indians. The demand in India is for affordable 1 Mbit/s plans with no download limit.

The price of Broadband in India is high compared to Europe or other parts of Asia, with a 1 Mbit/s connection costing between US$20 and $30 per month. Because of this, broadband is yet to filter down to the masses, with a penetration rate of 8.03 million (December 2009), or about 9.9% of the estimated 81 million total Internet subscribers.

In addition to the high prices, multiple providers have introduced a Fair Usage Policy on "Unlimited" plans, while data plans still have low data transfer limits (typically 100 GB) after which speed is reduced. For example, Airtel offers 100 Mbit/s, 200 Mbit/s plans, & 300 Mbit/s plans, which fall to 512 kbit/s due to FUP.

Domestic Fiber

The National Internet Backbone (NIB), owned and operated by the government, is the largest backbone in the country. Bharti (Airtel), GAILTel, Railtel, Reliance Communications and Tata Communications also own and operate large amounts of backbone fiber throughout the country.

International Connectivity

=== Indonesia ===
In April 2009, Indonesian telecommunication officials announced the start of an auction process for 2.3 GHz radio frequency for broadband wireless access. Only companies or their subsidiaries that are majority Indonesian-owned are able to compete per the 2007 Investment Law and accompanying Negative List.

The Department of Communications and Information (DEPKOMINFO)laid out the following process for interested bidders:

- 29 April – 5 May Pick-up bidding document;
- 6 May Submit written questions;
- 11–20 May Submit pre-qualification documents;
- 29 May Announce prequalification results;
- 1–5 June Prequalification appeal period;
- 3–9 June Pre-auction clarifying
- 10–12 June Implement three round auction;
- 12 June Announce auction results;
- 15–16 June Auction appeal period;
- 17 June Confirmation of auction results.

Indonesian officials plan to hold future auctions for the 3.3 and 3.5 GHz frequencies. No date is set for these future auctions. Earlier this year, DEPKOMINFO issued a Ministerial decree instructing operators using those frequencies to migrate to other frequencies.

Because of the Indonesian Negative List on Foreign Investment, U.S. firms will not be able to participate in the auction unless they partner with local companies to create a subsidiary that is majority Indonesian-owned. DEPKOMINFO officials said Indosat may not be able to compete because they are majority owned by a Qatar firm. The official added that a majority Indonesian-owned subsidiary of Indosat could still participate in the auction.

=== Japan ===
In 2001, the Japanese Cabinet released the e-Japan Priority Policy Programme. It stated that the private sector is to play the leading role in information technology, and the government's role is to implement an environment in which markets function smoothly through the promotion of fair competition and removal of unnecessary regulations. It also stated that government must play an active role in areas in which the private sector's activities do not fulfill the goals of facilitating e-government, closing the digital divide and promoting research and development. The e-Japan program extended tax incentives and budgetary support for carriers building fiber optic networks.

To implement this program, the Ministry of Public Management, Home Affairs, Posts and Telecommunications (MPHPT; it later changed its name to the Ministry of Internal Affairs and Communications, or MIC) pursued two policies: the National Broadband Initiative, which mandates that federal and local governments deploy fiber to underserved areas; and the e-Japan Strategy, which set forth the goal of providing access at affordable rates by 2005 to high speed Internet networks for at least 30 million households, and to ultra-high speed Internet networks for 10 million households. Japan reached this goal with a broadband household penetration rate of 41.7 percent in 2004.

These policies provided $60 million to municipalities investing in local public broadband networks, as well as low-interest loans to carriers to encourage them to build other broadband networks, including DSL, wireless, and cable systems. The loans were made through the Development Bank of Japan and the Telecommunications Advancement Organisation, both of which were largely funded by the government of Japan. In 2004, MIC issued its "Ubiquitous Japan" (u-Japan) policy. Its goal is to achieve a ubiquitous network society in which anything and anyone can easily access networks and freely transmit information from anywhere at any time by 2010. MIC is reviewing its regulations regarding broadband as part of its work towards achieving that goal.

=== South Korea ===
In February 2009, the Korea Communications Commission (KCC) announced plans to upgrade the national network to offer 1 Gbit/s service by 2012, an upgrade from the prior 100 Mbit/s guarantee. The plan was intended to cost 34.1 trillion won (US$24.6 billion) over the next five years. The central government will put up 1.3 trillion won, with the remainder coming from private telecom operators. The project is also expected to create more than 120,000 jobs – a win for the Korean economy. In November 2006, the government had announced it would invest 26.6 trillion won (US$28.3 billion) to upgrade networks—including fiber-to-the-home (FTTH), optical LAN and hyper fiber co-axial cable—in the country over the next four years. The government aims to upgrade a total of 20 million subscriber lines—10 million lines for fixed and wireless services each. The government is expecting industry to contribute funds toward the national upgrading project.

The decision to focus on broadband began in the mid-1990s and intensified after South Korea's economy was crippled by the collapse of the Asian financial markets in 1997, when policy makers targeted technology as a key sector for restoring the country's economic health. Korean regulators set a path for the industry with well-publicized national goals. All big office and apartment buildings would be given a fiber connection by 1997. By 2000, 30 percent of households would have broadband access through DSL or cable lines. By 2005, more than 80 percent of households would have access to fast connections of 20 Mbit/s or more—about the rate needed for high-definition television.

Most of the country's consumers were already served by the dominant carrier Korea Telecom, but the government encouraged competitors with a low-interest loan program for companies that built their own broadband facilities. The program offered $77 million in two years alone, with a particular focus on rural areas. The government offered other incentives for Korea Telecom. Once a state-owned monopoly, the company began the transition to private hands in 1993. But the government, which retained some shares until 2002, allowed the process to become final only on the condition that Korea Telecom bring broadband to all the villages in the country.

The government also offered Internet training for the portion of the population deemed likely to be left behind in the digital age. About 10 million people fell into this category in the first round of the government's initiative, including stay-at-home wives, military personnel, disabled citizens, and even prison inmates. That program was ultimately expanded to anyone who wanted it.

In 2004 a consortium that included the now defunct Ministry of Information and Communication, and private sector telecommunication and cable firms including KT, Hanaro Telecommunications, and others started to build a major infrastructure project called the Broadband Convergence Network (BcN). This infrastructure has been launched as a three-phase project. The first phase of the BcN extended from 2004 through 2005, the second phase extended from 2006 through 2007, and the third phase extended from 2008 through 2010. The timeline for the project has since been extended.

A major focus of the South Korean program is WiBro to offer seamless 100 Mbit/s hybrid networking. Its "Heterogeneous Network Integration Solution (HNIS) technology... weds 3G/4G service with any open Wi-Fi network to deliver speeds many times faster than North Americans can get from their wireless providers. The technology is designed to work without a lot of consumer intervention. For example, HNIS will automatically provision open Wi-Fi access wherever subscribers travel. The combination of mobile broadband with Wi-Fi works seamlessly as well. Currently, smartphones can use Wi-Fi or mobile data, but not both at the same time... While mobile operators cope with spectrum and capacity issues, HNIS can reduce the load on wireless networks, without creating a hassle for wireless customers who used to register with every Wi-Fi service they encountered. The theoretical speed of an HNIS-enhanced 3G and Wi-Fi connection in South Korea will be 60 Mbps when SK Telecom fully deploys the technology this year. As SK expands the technology to its 4G networks, theoretical maximum speeds will increase to 100 Mbps.". SK plans to equip all of its smartphones with the new technology starting in 2013. See heterogenous network for more on the technology.

=== Lebanon ===
The National Broadband Strategy is a project initiated by the Partnership for Lebanon. The Broadband plan would bring larger, high speed communication pipes that would allow Lebanese citizens to have faster access to information and change the way they live, work, play, and learn. Lebanon's outdated communications infrastructure puts Lebanese industry at a competitive disadvantage, costing jobs, decreasing revenue, and slowing economic growth. The Partnership for Lebanon is working with the Lebanese government and business leaders to modernize Lebanon's communications infrastructure through innovation and investment. In so doing, the Partnership is helping Lebanon update technology, reduce connectivity costs, and improve ICT quality across the board.

The Partnership is working specifically with the Telecommunications Regulatory Agency (TRA) to develop a national broadband strategy designed to bring broadband to Lebanon's urban and rural communities. As part of this effort, the Partnership is conducting broadband business analysis, developing network architecture options, and crafting a regulatory framework to facilitate the successful implementation of a modern communications infrastructure. The Partnership is also working with the government owned telecom operator, Ogero, to increase Lebanon's international bandwidth capacity. The Partnership has provided Ogero with an Internet Exchange Point and is assembling the equipment needed to install two state of the art International Internet Gateways. To help educate local stakeholders about the benefits of a modern communications infrastructure, the Partnership and in coordination with the LBSG Committee which represents economic councils, private sector leaders and professional assiociations, launched a recent Advertising Campaign. The objective of this campaign is to raise awareness and educate the Lebanese public on the need of a True Broadband Infrastructure in Lebanon. The True Broadband Infrastructure will encourage economic growth and social development. The campaign second objective is to drive people to sign the manifesto.

=== Malaysia ===
High Speed Broadband (HSBB) is a broadband service that offers bandwidth delivered at network speeds of 10 Mbit/s and above when compared to normal broadband (Broadband to the General Population (BBGP)) which delivers bandwidth through wired and wireless technologies at network speeds ranging between 256 kbit/s and 4 Mbit/s. Eventually Malaysia will see basic HSBB packages offering network speeds between 20 and 50 Mbit/s and up to 100 Mbit/s for consumers while businesses will have maximum network speeds available up to 1 Gbit/s.

To understand the deployment of HSBB, the role HSBB plays in the larger world of broadband deployment in Malaysia must first be understood. Broadband deployment in Malaysia is carried out using two approaches – normal broadband, known as Broadband to the General Population (BBGP) delivered via wired (DSL) and wireless technologies (WiMax, WiFi, 3G/HSDPA) while the other will be through HSBB.

BBGP (via both wired and wireless modes) is deployed nationwide while HSBB (available only through the wired mode) will only initially be concentrated in the Klang Valley, Iskandar Malaysia and key industrial zones throughout the country. It is expected that 1.3 million premises will have the ability to access HSBB coverage by end 2012.

=== Singapore ===
The Singaporean government will provide up to S$750 million (US$520 million) in grants to build the Next Generation National Broadband Network. It will be wireline and wireless, and have speeds ranging from 100 Mbit/s to 1 Gbit/s. The network will be open to all service providers, threatening SingTel and StarHub's market dominance. The government will not prevent companies from building their own networks, however. Bidding is taking place in two stages – first, for the passive infrastructure, and then for the active infrastructure. In September 2008, IDA selected OpenNet, in which SingTel has a 30 percent stake, to design, build, and operate the passive infrastructure.

Wireless@SG, which is launched on 1 December 2006, is a wireless broadband programme developed by IDA Singapore as part of its Next Generation National Infocomm Infrastructure initiative. Wireless@SG is powered by the network of three wireless operators, iCell, M1 Limited and SingTel. It will be provided free for all Singapore residents and visitors till 31 March 2013. Users can enjoy free, both in-door and outdoor seamless wireless broadband access with speeds of up to 1 Mbit/s at most public areas.

=== Taiwan ===
Over the past ten years, the Taiwan authorities have pursued a series of ICT infrastructure development projects, beginning with the "E-Government" initiative in 2000 that aimed to create more efficient, networked public services. The authorities expanded E-Government to include "E-Society," "E-Industry," and "E-Opportunity" initiatives under 2002's "E-Taiwan" plan. According to James Lo, Section Chief in the National Communications Commission (NCC) Department of Planning, from 2003 to 2007, the Taiwan authorities and private sector partners spent over US$10 billion on the broadband development. By the end of 2007, there were six million broadband internet accounts in Taiwan.

=== Thailand ===
Some of the nation's most powerful telecommunications executives and the regulatory agency, Nation Telecommunications Union (NTC), met for the first time on 2 July 2009 to formulate a plan for Meaningful Broadband. The plan calls for interacting with prime minister, and a spectrum of Thai ministries to establish the role of broadband in achieving public-policy reforms in the Abhisit government.

The event, held at the Oriental Hotel, was the first meeting of the Meaningful Broadband Working Group, led by Craig Warren Smith, a visiting professor of Chulalongkorn University's Center for Ethics of Science and Technology. Sponsored by NTC, the event released a white paper on Meaningful Broadband.

The report rejects the path to broadband favored by Singapore and other advanced nations which serves affluent citizens who can afford high speed internet. Instead, it calls for a new "broadband ecosystem" for Thailand, that is focused primarily on the Middle of the Pyramid (MOP), a middle-income group of Thais who make from $2 to $7 per day. By bringing 28 million of these MOP Thais into subsidized meaningful mobile broadband applications, Smith predicts a "wealth effect" that could bring equity and sustainability to the Thai economy.

Responding to the framework, Khun Supachai called was one of several members of the group that advocated a follow-up study that would prepare for a meeting with Prime Minister Abhisit along with ministers of Finance, Education, ICT and other relevant parties. "We need to figure out the roles of government, the regulator and the telecommunications operators in establishing broadband that brings optimal benefits to Thailand." Supachai, agreed to be host and sponsor of further research in preparation of the next meeting of the Working Group to be held in September.

"Along with painting the big picture of how broadband could serve the nation, we should focus specifically how it can serve education and human resources development," said Montchai Noosong, executive vice president of TOT.

"Central to the 'meaningful' idea is a new approach to Ethics, said Chulalongkorn University Soraj Hongladarom. "We want Thailand to develop a way to help users choose broadband applications that will lead them to happiness not addiction," he said.

== Oceania ==
=== Australia ===
On 15 September 2009, the Minister for Broadband, Communications and the Digital Economy, Senator Stephen Conroy, announced fundamental reforms to Australian's telecommunications landscape.

In April 2009, the Australian Government announced that it would establish a new company that will invest up to $43 billion over 8 years to build and operate a wholesale-only, open access National Broadband Network. The new network will provide fiber optic to the home and workplace, supplemented with next generation wireless and satellite technologies to deliver superfast broadband services. The Government plans to sell down its ownership of the company – NBN Co. Ltd. – 5 years after the network is built.

Again in April 2009, the Government released a discussion paper entitled "National Broadband Network: Regulatory Reform for 21st Century Broadband". The paper is based on public comments on the NBN. The paper appears to be similar to an FCC NPRM or NOI. It outlines the method of establishing the NBN and also sketches general regulatory reforms to assist the market in the future. To facilitate fiber build-out, the government will simplify land right of way procedures.

The Australian Government had previously (in 2007) planned to subsidize a privately operated fiber-to-the-node project. The collapse of capital markets altered that plan. (Note: For a full history of the decision process to arrive at the current strategy, see: PDF) (Note: For an overview of the national plan and links to details see: dbcde.gov.au)

=== New Zealand ===
The government has two plans to bring fast broadband to 97.8% of the population by 2019. The first is the NZ$1.35bn Ultra-Fast Broadband project where fibre to the home will be available to 75% of the population. The second is the NZ$300M Rural Broadband Initiative to upgrade rural telephone exchanges and to deploy fixed 3G networks.

== See also ==
- Global Internet usage
