= Nova Scotia Department of Economic and Rural Development =

The Department of Economic and Rural Development and Tourism was a part of the Government of Nova Scotia. It was created in 2011 from the former Department of Economic and Rural Development. Its primary purpose was to stimulate the economy of Nova Scotia. The Department did this by helping Nova Scotia businesses to expand employment opportunities, and by encouraging the establishment and growth of commerce and industry in the province. The departmental mandate also included designing economic development policies, programs, and activities that strengthen economic and social conditions in the province. The department was dissolved in April 2015, when it was superseded by the new and smaller Department of Business. Some programs and assignments have also been transferred from the Department of Economic and Rural Development and Tourism to other departments and crown corporations such as the Department of Labour and Advanced Education, Tourism Nova Scotia, and Nova Scotia Business Inc.

The last minister of the department was Michel Samson.

== Divisions and agencies ==
=== Divisions ===
The last Deputy Minister of the Department was Simon d'Entremont. The Department was made up of four divisions:

==== Decision Support ====
Decision Support provides research, evaluation, and performance-measurement leadership to all aspects of the economic development, innovation, and technology system. It focuses on the "big picture," ensuring the system is effectively supporting economic growth. This section also leads overall management of relations with the department's agencies, boards and commissions.

==== Economic Strategies & Initiatives ====
Economic Strategies & Initiatives provides research and support for the development of government policies and plans for economic development, innovation and technology. The work of the Economic Strategies & Initiatives Division includes the Broadband for Rural Nova Scotia initiative.

==== Community and Rural Development ====
Community and Rural Development provides information, advice, and resources to support development to local organizations as well as the business community.

==== Procurement Services ====
Procurement Services provide a variety of electronic tools for businesses to use to bid or to develop business opportunities with the Province of Nova Scotia.

=== Agencies ===
A number of agencies are included under the Ministry:

- Innovacorp: assists IT, life sciences, and clean technology start-up companies to commercialize their technologies
- Nova Scotia Business Inc.: works to attract foreign direct investment (FDI) and assists Nova Scotia companies through trade development, business financing and venture capital.
- Film Nova Scotia: oversees the development of Nova Scotia's film industry, including the Nova Scotia film tax credit.
- Trade Centre Limited: attracts events to Halifax through its venues and businesses
- Waterfront Development Commission: oversees events on the Halifax waterfront, located near Halifax Port, such as the Nova Scotia Tall Ships Festival.

== Former department titles ==
The department has undergone numerous name changes including:

- Department of Economic and Rural Development (2009 - 2011)
- Office of Economic Development (March 2003 - 2007)
- Department of Economic Development (1999 - March 2003 and 2007 - 2008)
- Department of Economic Development and Tourism (ca. 1998)
- Department of Economic Renewal Agency 1995-96
