= Eastlink (company) =

Canadian cable television and telecommunications company

Bragg Communications Inc.
- Trade name: Eastlink
- Type: Private
- Industry: Telecommunications
- Founded: 1969; 57 years ago (as Bragg Communications Inc.); 1998; 28 years ago (as EastLink)
- Headquarters: Halifax, Nova Scotia, Canada
- Key people: John Bragg, Lee Bragg
- Products: Digital Television, Cable High Speed Internet, Telephone, Cellular, Home Security and Automation
- Revenue: $310.6 million (cable); $273 million (Internet); $6.3 million (advertising) (all 2010)
- Net income: $53.8 million
- Number of employees: 1,500
- ASN: 11260
- Website: www.eastlink.ca

Bragg Communications Inc., doing business as Eastlink, is a Canadian cable television and telecommunications company. The privately held company was founded in Nova Scotia in 1969 by the Bragg family, and has grown since through the amalgamation of several telecommunications companies.

== History ==
The company began in Amherst, Nova Scotia, in 1969, where it was later issued one of the first cable licences granted by the CRTC. It acquired Halifax Cablevision Ltd., at the time the largest system in Eastern Canada, in 1985. Through a series of acquisitions, which included the purchase of Amtelecom, Persona, Bluewater, Delta and Coast Cable, Eastlink became the fifth-largest cable television provider in Canada by 2010, with approximately 1,500 employees working in offices across the country. As of 2010, it was the largest privately owned cable company in Canada, with 457,075 subscribers in nine provinces (excluding Saskatchewan). It remains privately held by the Bragg family of Oxford, Nova Scotia.

In 2008, Eastlink purchased the wireline business of ISN, Prince Edward Island's only local internet service provider. As of 2020, ISN re-entered the wireline business with a home and business fibre service.

In 2023, Eastlink purchased Kapuskasing, Ontario ISP NeoTech.

== Service offerings ==
=== Cable Internet and TV ===
Eastlink delivers digital video/television and cable-network-based Internet services with speeds up to 940 megabits per second, one of the faster networks of this kind in North America. It was one of the first companies in North America to bundle digital cable and broadband Internet services with home phone service.

Eastlink's 350 and 940 megabit service have unlimited usage, both while standalone and while included in a bundle.

Eastlink also produces community channels branded as Eastlink Community TV to serve the company's cable customers.

Eastlink offers video on demand, digital video recorders and high definition television (HDTV) services in many communities across Canada.

=== Wireless ===
Eastlink spent $25 million during the 2008 Advanced Wireless Services auction for 19 licenses in Ontario and Atlantic Canada as well as Grande Prairie, Alberta. The company announced in 2011 that it would introduce wireless services, beginning with Nova Scotia and Prince Edward Island. In February 2013, Eastlink launched its wireless service with evolved high speed packet access (HSPA+) and long-term evolution (LTE) services available at the launch date.

As Eastlink deployed many wireless repeater towers for its Motorola Canopy service launched as part of the Broadband for Rural Nova Scotia initiative, upgrading these to serve as a cellular and Wi-Fi mesh network with the intent of attracting third parties with no tower access, such as Wind, to partner with Eastlink.

In May 2016, Eastlink announced that it would launch wireless service in the cities of Timmins and Sudbury in northern Ontario. Eastlink activated its LTE network, including Voice over LTE, in Timmins on June 1, 2016 with the LTE network in Sudbury activated on June 9, 2016.

In March 2022, Eastlink launched a 5G network in partnership with Ericsson. Right now the new 5G network is live in parts of the Halifax Regional Municipality and Saint John, New Brunswick.

=== CLEC services ===
Eastlink was the first major Canadian cable company to offer competitive local telephone service in its territory in 1999 over a fibre optic network. In 2005, the area code 902 telephone market was the most competitive telephone exchange in North America and this was credited to Eastlink's presence in the market. Eastlink was also the first provider to deliver local telephone competition to its service area in New Brunswick in 2005.

=== Fixed wireless Internet in rural Nova Scotia ===
In 2010, Eastlink launched another service in cooperation with other providers and the government of Nova Scotia's Broadband for Rural Nova Scotia initiative: a Motorola Canopy-based rural Internet service capable of 0.5 megabit uploads, 1.5 megabit downloads, which was intended to reach "100% of civic addresses" in Nova Scotia. This level of coverage is unique in North America and is a particular challenge in a province prone to extreme weather, fog, and winds. Eastlink claimed at public forums in early 2010 that the service would operate at under 100ms latency and accordingly be useful for VoIP from arbitrary third parties such as Skype, but this has not been verified. However, latency to the towers themselves was reliably under 2ms at that time.

==== Alternatives ====
Critics of the Canopy service, notably Bell, argued that it is expensive (due to shorter range repeater towers). The strategy was poorly coordinated with cable networks (there being for instance no subsidy to extend the cable network where it would be easy to do so or even where it would facilitate the wireless services). Most open-systems-minded users considered Canopy an impractical direction compared to expansion of Wi-Fi hotspot services. Its primary competitor, Aliant, by contrast has invested in Wi-Fi, GSM and DSL services, but they remained as of 2011 expensive or unavailable in rural Nova Scotia.

Original Eastlink logo 1998-2012

Some jurisdictions that report unsatisfactory results with all of these technologies, including Canopy, such as Door County, Wisconsin's Washington Island, have reported positive results with powerline networking. However, as power-lines do not reach "100% of civic addresses" they do not address quite the same issues. The deployment of powerline-based meters by Emera subsidiary Bangor Hydro, which also owns Nova Scotia Power Inc. on the board of which Eastlink CEO Lee Bragg serves, suggests that this technology may ultimately become part of the Eastlink mix in some rural areas.

As of early 2011, Rogers, Aliant, and Telus' mobile Internet offerings are extraordinarily expensive for heavy users and tethering of personal computers is not necessarily included under these plans; the price per gigabyte of the Eastlink service is clearly superior to any of these offerings. However, the maximum speed is much less (1.5Mbit/s download versus up to 21Mbit/s) and more so when these cellular providers upgrade to dual-carrier (42Mbit/s) HSPA+. For those more concerned with speed and less with price, cellular options will be a superior rural networking choice; for those concerned with price, Eastlink's fixed wireless service, the expansion of Wi-Fi hotspots, and the use of 802.11u and 802.21 will continue to form a more reliable mesh especially in attracting tourists or in densely populated areas.

==== Wired Network Extensions ====
In terms of speed, where it could reach groups of customers inaccessible by Canopy, Eastlink's wired network would be substantially faster, operating at up to 100Mbit/s download, compared to 1.5Mbit/s download. Fixed-wireless internet is, however, many times faster than dial-up (1.5Mbit/s) and does (unlike satellite) satisfy most expectations of "broadband Internet access". Broadband is economically or subjectively defined and is perceived very differently by persons with different latency expectations and service usage patterns, therefore perceptions of its quality are also subjective; Persons accustomed to dialup service may be thrilled with Canopy performance, whereas those used to wired cable find it slow or flaky.

Canopy service deployment encountered numerous challenges in practice, including installation of unforeseen wireless relay towers installed on an ad hoc basis that increase latency, reduce service reliability and load other towers – the inherent problems of a mesh network.

==== Service and installation concerns ====
Eastlink was not, as of November 2011, effectively held to its contractual obligation to provide "100% of civic addresses" with service nor its latency promises, even where most such customers could be easily accommodated by extending its wired network to these existing wireless relay towers. In particular, users on islands with water access were denied service as of summer 2011.

Installers as of November 2011 had no way to test latency before asking for customer sign-off and final installation, meaning that any user whose latency needs could not be met would not know that until after they had agreed the service was adequate, based only on raw signal strength.

As of late 2011, the project had still not yet reached its promise of "100% of civic addresses." Eastlink has not commented on the consistency of speeds or latency on this network nor released any public quality of service (QoS) statistics or actual usage information about the services its users actually use. It was widely anticipated that Eastlink would offer access to its new cell network in 2012 on favourable terms to cut-off rural users.

== Coverage ==
Provinces which currently have some Eastlink service are: Nova Scotia, Prince Edward Island, New Brunswick (limited to southern regions), Newfoundland and Labrador, Quebec, Ontario, Manitoba, Alberta, and British Columbia. It also previously served the town of Point Roberts, Washington, in the United States, a geographic exclave of Washington which is accessible by land only from British Columbia; EastLink announced it would discontinue service to Point Roberts in 2019, citing the cost of maintaining the aging cable infrastructure in the town.

Service in Saskatchewan was available in the past but is currently not available to new customers. Access Communications in Saskatchewan acquired the rights to the cable TV services in the areas formerly covered by Eastlink.

In previous years, Eastlink operated acquired divisions Coast Cable on the Sunshine Coast, and Delta Cable in Delta, British Columbia, which it acquired in 2007. These brands were phased out to unify these divisions under Eastlink.

Eastlink acquired Cable & Wireless and its service territory on the island of Bermuda for US$70 million in 2011.

== Carriage disputes ==
On May 25, 2023, Eastlink announced that it would not renew its carriage agreement with Corus Entertainment, resulting in all of its specialty channels being removed from its services on June 27, 2023. Almost a year later on June 6, 2024, Corus announced an agreement to reinstate its channels on Eastlink, albeit in paid theme packs rather than as part of the main television bundle.
