= Life project =

Life project (Italian: Progetto di vita) of the person with disability (Law no. 104 of February 5, 1992, Article 3) was introduced for the first time in the Italian regulatory system by Law no. 328 of 8 November 2000 and it represents the heart of Law no. 112 of 22 June 2016, which has among its fundamental principles the activation of paths to promote the well-being, full social inclusion and autonomy of people with disabilities. A systemic approach to the Life Project also represents the guarantee element of rights and quality of life aimed at giving full effect to the principle of social inclusion expressed in Article 19 of the Convention on the Rights of Persons with Disabilities. The latter provides that every person with disabilities is guaranteed the right to full integration in the community by ensuring equal freedom of choice as well as full involvement in society life.

== Individual project ==
The concept of Life Project was introduced in Italy by Law no. 328 of 8 November 2000 called "Framework Law for the implementation of the integrated system of social interventions and services" which in Article 14 paragraph 2 provides for the preparation of an "individual project" aimed at the full inclusion of the person with disabilities in the family and social context and within pathways aimed at school and work inclusion. It is expected that this project is prepared by municipalities in agreement with Local Health Units.

«Individual project includes, in addition to the diagnostic-functional assessment, care and rehabilitation services charged to the National Health Service, services to the person [...], as well as the economic measures necessary to overcome conditions of poverty, marginalisation and social exclusion.»

— art. 14 paragraph 2, Law no. 328/2000

Starting with Law no. 328 of 8 November 2000, the adoption of an innovative approach to the provision of welfare services is promoted that goes beyond the purely "assistance" perspective and centralizes actions through the creation of a real project. As argued by Arconzo, Ragone and Bissaro, what is defined as a "project model" (in Italian "modello progettuale") is introduced, whose actions are aimed at achieving objectives defined on the basis of a multidimensional assessment of the needs of the person who is directly involved in the path.

In this direction, the definition of "individual project" adopted by Law no. 328 of 8 November 2000 focuses attention on the centrality of the person as the point of convergence of the actions implemented by the welfare services system. As stated by Marco Rasconi, president of Unione italiana lotta alla distrofia muscolare (Italian Union fight to muscular dystrophy), the construction and implementation of an "individual project" promotes "the global taking charge of the person with disabilities".

«In its definition and implementation, the Life project thus becomes a dynamic process capable of adapting to the needs of people who change in different stages of life, ensuring continuity in the processes. Its construction is never done by one person. It is the result of interaction between several people: the person with a disability, their family and who is in charge of her/him. We would therefore have aspects expressed, aspects detected and shared.»

— Marco Rasconi, Ci vuole un Progetto di Vita

The potential that lies in the construction of the Project of Life is found in the possibility of putting at the center the person who is involved in the choices related to her/his life and pathways of social inclusion. By incorporating the needs and aspirations expressed by the beneficiary within a personalized pathway, it is possible to respond through a global and concerted action among all those involved, unlike the response capacity that could arise from sectoral and distinct interventions that look at the person as the addressee of individual services without transversal coordination.

== Policies in Italy and Europe ==
"Two-year action programme for the promotion of the rights and integration of people with disabilities", adopted for the first time by the Italian Government in 2013, reinforces the importance that lies in the drafting of the Life project of the person with disabilities. As underlined by Anffas, this program recognizes in the full implementation of the life project a real "perfect subjective right and therefore fully enforceable" (in Italian ""diritto soggettivo perfetto e quindi pienamente esigibile"). Within the programme, specific areas of action are identified as priorities with respect to the development of interventions aimed at ensuring respect for the rights of persons with disabilities. These action lines contribute to the achievement of the objectives of the Convention on the Rights of Persons with Disabilities and the European Disability Strategy 2010–2020. The latter was defined in 2010 by the European Commission starting from the principles expressed by the Convention on the Rights of Persons with Disabilities and as an integration of the Europe 2020 strategy and the Charter of Fundamental Rights of the European Union with the aim of guaranteeing the protection of the rights of persons with disabilities on the basis of the principle of equality. Among the areas of action identified by the European Disability Strategy 2010–2020, in addition to promoting the principles of accessibility, participation and equality, specific reference is made to the different areas involved in the life of the person starting from the issue related to health as well as the school and work context with a view to full social inclusion.

In the same way the European Disability Strategy 2021-2030 identifies priority areas towards which to direct interventions to be implemented through a cross-sectoral approach, following the path traced by 2030 Agenda for Sustainable Development, with particular reference to the enhancement of the principle of quality of life and the promotion of pathways to autonomy aimed at deinstitutionalization.

== Life project for "After us" (in Italian "Dopo di Noi") ==
The centrality of the Life Project (intended as "individual project" referred to in Article 14 of Law no. 328 of 8 November 2000) appears to be among the founding principles of Law no. 112 of 22 June 2016, better known as "After us" (in Italian "Dopo di Noi") Law, containing "Provisions on assistance for people with severe disabilities without family support". As supported by Anffas in the construction of the Life project lies the principle for the activation of paths to promote the well-being, full social inclusion and autonomy of people with disabilities.

The law provides for measures of assistance, care and protection for the person with disabilities when he/she can no longer be supported by the family through a progressive taking charge of the person during the life of parents and caregivers allowing them to deal with the concern for the future of their children when they will can no longer be with them in the so-called "After us" (in Italian "Dopo di Noi").

As argued by Senator Annamaria Parente, rapporteur in the Senate of Law no. 112 of 22 June 2016, the Life Project is placed at the center of the law tracing a path that wants to lead to build the "After us" (in Italian "Dopo di Noi") in "during us" (in Italian "durante noi") to ensure that this can become an "approach of all" for the construction of an integrated and proximity welfare and for which "After us" (in Italian "Dopo di Noi") Law can become a lighthouse.

The Interministerial Decree implementing Law no. 112 of 22 June 2016 defines in Article 2 paragraphs 2 and 3 the "personalized project":

«The project identifies the specific supports that the severely disabled person needs, starting from the health, social and social-healthcare services [...]. The personalised project contains the project budget, as a set of all the human, economic, instrumental resources that can be used in a flexible, dynamic and integrated way. The personalised project is defined by ensuring the widest possible participation of the person with severe disability, taking into account his/her wishes, expectations and preferences and also providing for his/her full involvement in the subsequent monitoring and evaluation. Where the person with severe disability is not in a position to express his or her full will, he or she is supported by his or her parents or those who protect their interests.»

— Article 2 paragraphs 2 and 3, Ministerial Decree 23.11.2016

"After us" (in Italian "Dopo di Noi") Law promotes a real paradigm shift recognizing in the subsidiary matrix necessary for the realization of life projects a fundamental and propaedeutic element for the realization of "After us" (in Italian "Dopo di Noi") in "during us" (in Italian "durante noi") activating projects triggered by a "bottom-up" approach. As argued by Bollani, "Law no. 112 designs "After us" as a co-design action that involves all these stakeholders (parents and children, private social and public service operators) to work together".

Since Life project approach is aimed at the deinstitutionalization of the person with disabilities, the housing situation in its dimension of inclusion turns out to be crucial, for this reason it is important to design innovative models that develop pathways of social inclusion aimed at the creation of a housing welfare.

The person with disabilities, through his or her life project, is placed at the center of the system as

«the beneficiary of the project that from being the object of intervention decided by others becomes the subject of the project, in which he or she participates by right because it concerns his or her life.»

— Giampiero Griffo, 2020
