= John Bragg (businessman) =

Canadian businessman (born 1940)

John L. Bragg CC ONS
- Born: May 3, 1940 (age 86); Collingwood, Nova Scotia

John Louis Bragg CC ONS (born May 3, 1940) is a Canadian businessman, philanthropist and former Chancellor of Mount Allison University. He is the founder of the Bragg Group, a holding company that includes Oxford Frozen Foods, the world's largest wild blueberry processor, and Eastlink, a telecommunications company. Bragg is known for his role in developing rural economies in Atlantic Canada and for his extensive philanthropic work, particularly in education and healthcare.

== Early life and education ==
John was born in Collingwood, Nova Scotia, on May 3, 1940. His family has deep roots in the region, with ancestors settling in Cumberland County seven generations ago. As a teenager, Bragg began harvesting wild blueberries from abandoned farmland to earn money for his education. He attended Mount Allison University, where he earned a Bachelor of Commerce and a Bachelor of Education. He later briefly attended Dalhousie Law School before deciding to focus on his entrepreneurial pursuits.

== Business career ==
He is currently the CEO of the Bragg Group of Companies.

Bragg's business career began in 1968 when he founded Oxford Frozen Foods in Oxford, Nova Scotia. He built his first processing plant to address a major crop surplus and low prices, ensuring local growers could sell their product. The company has since grown to become the world's largest wild blueberry processor and one of North America's largest producers of frozen vegetables. His vision transformed the wild blueberry industry from a small-scale cottage industry into a high-tech, export-driven business with markets in more than 35 countries. Oxford Frozen Foods Limited also operates the largest fruit farm in the world, with over 12,000 acres (49 km^{2}) of wild blueberries.

He also founded a cable television company in the 1970s which became known as Bragg Communications and was subsequently expanded to become Eastlink.

Bragg built his first blueberry-processing factory in 1968, and the business is still experiencing double-digit growth today. In 2015, Bragg opened a new facility in Saint-Isidore, New Brunswick, that is considered to "the most modern blueberry processing facility in the world." It can process up to 1.5 million pounds of blueberries per day.

Bragg had a net worth of $1.11 billion CDN in 2015.

He was ranked No. 86 in Canadian Business's list of Canada's richest people in 2017.

In 2021 Donald Savoie published a book titled The Rural Entrepreneur, John Bragg.

== Business involvement ==
He was a director of TD Bank Financial Group, Export Development Canada, Maritime Tel & Tel, Canada Bread Limited, Empire Company Limited and Sobeys Inc.

== Recognition ==
In 1996, he was made an Officer of the Order of Canada and promoted to Companion in 2022 with the following citation.

John Bragg’s passion for the prosperity and well-being of Atlantic Canada is legendary. As CEO of the Bragg Group of Companies, he has overseen its extensive growth and diversification, which includes Oxford Frozen Foods, the world’s largest provider of wild blueberries, all while maintaining and nurturing the company’s Maritime roots. Leveraging his experience and success, he has fervently advocated for rural development and sustainability, one community at a time. Committed to empowering individuals through education, he helped establish more than 60 scholarships at several of the region’s universities.

In 1994, he was awarded the National Entrepreneur of the Year Award by the Governor General of Canada Ray Hnatyshyn. He was named to the Order of Nova Scotia in 2018.

He was the inaugural inductee into the Wild Blueberry Association of North America Hall of Fame in 2023.

Bragg and his business empire were the subject of a lengthy interview/profile in The Globe and Mail, which observed that "Beneath the veneer of the rural blueberry baron, there is one tough, risk-taking tycoon with an ardour for growth, game-changing technology, and debt financing."

In 2024, he was interviewed by Shane Parrish of the knowledge project.

In June 2025, he was awarded the King Charles III Coronation Medal.

== Personal life ==
He and wife Judy have four children, all of whom have worked or now work in the business.

He lives in Nova Scotia, Canada.
