= Henrick von Scheel =

- Born: 1969 (age 56–57); Denmark
- Occupation: Futurist
- Known for: Co-architect of Industry 4.0 and advocate of the Fourth Industrial Revolution

Henrick von Scheel (born 1969) is a Danish futurist and researcher.

== Biography ==
Von Scheel was born in 1969 in Denmark.

Von Scheel first gained continental attention in 2009 when he joined an advisory group to the German Federal Ministry of Economics & Technology that drafted what became the country’s Digitale Agenda; the European Commission later embedded much of that agenda in its Europe 2020 programme. By the time the federal working group unveiled the term “Industry 4.0” in 2013 he was quoted as one of its drivers. A Forbes report on post-Brexit industrial policy described him as the “Godfather of Industry 4.0.”

He was appointed Professor at the UWI Arthur Lok Jack Global School of Business, Trinidad and Tobago, in 2021, where the school credits his career-long “research in strategy management and futures studies.”

== Awards and recognition ==
In 2019, the Mohammed Bin Rashid Al Maktoum Knowledge Award jury in Dubai honoured von Scheel as “Pioneer of Industry 4.0 and the Global Digital Revolution,” citing the worldwide application of his competitiveness frameworks.
