= Hybrid Access Networks =

Type of broadband network architecture

Hybrid Access Networks refer to a special architecture for broadband access networks where two different network technologies are combined to improve bandwidth. A frequent motivation for such Hybrid Access Networks to combine one xDSL network with a wireless network such as LTE. The technology is generic and can be applied to combine different types of access networks such as DOCSIS, WiMAX, 5G or satellite networks. The Broadband Forum has specified an architecture as a framework for the deployment of such converged networks.

== Use cases ==
One of the main motivations for such Hybrid Access Networks is to provide faster Internet services in rural areas where it is not always cost-effective to deploy faster xDSL technologies such as G.Fast or VDSL2 that cannot cover long distances between the street cabinet and the home. Several governments, notably in Europe, required network operators to provide fast Internet services to all inhabitants with a minimum of 30 Mbps by 2020.

A second use case is to improve the reliability of the access link given that it is unlikely that both the xDSL network and the wireless network will fail at the same time.

A third motivation is the fast service turnup. The customer can immediately install the hybrid network access and use the wireless leg while the network operator is installing the wired part.

== Technology ==
Several techniques are defined by the Broadband Forum to create Hybrid Access Networks. To illustrate them, we assume that the end user has an hybrid CPE (Customer-premises equipment) router that is attached to both a wired access network such as xDSL and a wireless one such as LTE. Other deployments are possible, e.g., the end user might have two different access routers that are linked together by a cable instead of a single hybrid CPE router.

The first deployment scenario is where the network operator provides a hybrid CPE router to each subscriber but no specialised equipment in the operator's network. There are two possible configurations for IP addresses. A first deployment scenario is to allocate different IP addresses to the wired and wireless interfaces. In this case, the hybrid CPE router needs to load-balance intelligently the packets over the two networks. In particular, it must ensure that all packets belonging to a given TCP connection are sent over the same interface. A second deployment scenario is to allocate the same IP address to both the wired and the wireless networks and configure the routing in these networks to ensure that packets are correctly routed.

The second deployment scenario is where the network operator provides a hybrid CPE router to each subscriber and installs a Hybrid Aggregation Gateway (HAG) inside its access networks. The Hybrid Aggregation Gateway plays an important role in balancing the packets sent by and destined to the hybrid CPE router over the two access networks. Two technologies have been defined and deployed to enable hybrid CPE routers to interact with Hybrid Aggregation Gateways. The main objective of these technologies is to efficiently use the two access links even if they have different delay and bandwidth. One technical difficulty that occurs when distributing packets over such heterogeneous links is to accurately detect congestion, notably on the wireless network whose bandwidth can vary quickly, and cope with the reordering which is caused by the delay difference. One approach uses GRE tunnels to hide the two links to the upper layer protocol. Both the hybrid CPE and the HAG need to reorder the received packets to ensure that TCP receives in-sequence packets. The second approach uses Multipath TCP, a recent TCP extension that has been designed to enable the transmission of the packets that belong to a single session across different links. This approach leverages the ability of MPTCP to efficiently handle congestion and cope with reordering on the heterogeneous access links. MPTCP needs support in both the host and the server. Two approaches have been defined for the interactions between the hybrid CPE router and the Hybrid Aggregation Gateway. The transparent mode is used when the Hybrid Aggregation Gateway is placed on the path of all packets sent by the hybrid CPE router. Otherwise, the Hybrid Aggregation Gateway includes a TCP converter as defined in. Additional details on Hybrid Access Networks and their deployment are described in

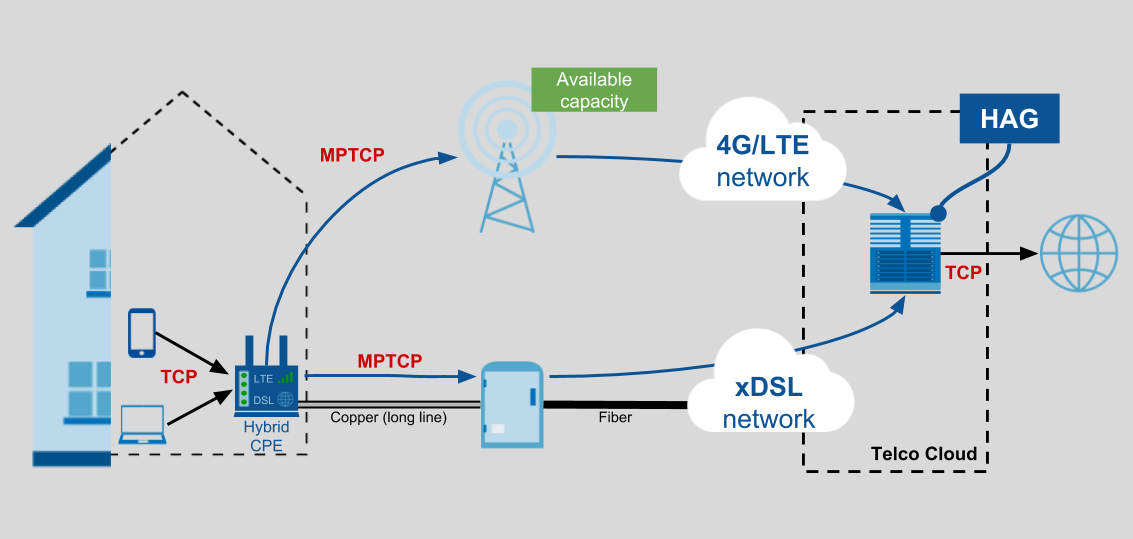
Hybrid Access Network

== Deployments ==
The first commercial deployments started in 2015. Several deployments of Hybrid Access Networks have already been documented.

- Deutsche Telekom has deployed Hybrid Access Networks by using GRE Tunnels
- The French ISP Free has also deployed Hybrid Access Networks in France
- Proximus has deployed Hybrid Access Networks in Belgium; Telia has deployed Hybrid Access Networks in Lithuania and Finland; BT has deployed Hybrid 4G Speed Boost for SMEs in UK; Go Malta has deployed a Hybrid Access Network in Malta; KPN has deployed hybrid Access Networks by using Multipath TCP. The solution is available to 440,000 addresses by using Multipath TCP, provided by company Tessares. The Hybrid Access Technology has been transferred to Belgium company Wavenet in 2024.
