= Broadband for Rural Nova Scotia initiative =

Canadian provincial government development initiative

Broadband for Rural Nova Scotia was a government initiative intended to provide broadband (500 kbit/s upload, 1.5 Mbit/s download) services to 100% of civic addresses in Nova Scotia, Canada. The initiative was a public private partnership co-funded by the governments of Canada and Nova Scotia, and three Internet service providers. The Motorola Canopy fixed wireless 900 MHz system was selected in 2006–7 to provide the service. Prior to this program it had not been deployed in Nova Scotia.

== History ==
In May 2006, the Nova Scotia government announced that it would work with a number of partners to ensure that every Nova Scotian would have broadband access. The Broadband for Rural Nova Scotia initiative was established to deliver high speed access to the Internet to "100 per cent of Nova Scotia civic addresses" by the end of 2009.

== Rationale ==
The initiative intended to offer entire province access to basic broadband services and make Nova Scotia one of the most connected jurisdictions in Canada and in North America. A similar project was undertaken in Finland with good results.

At the time of the 2006 announcement, data showed that high-speed Internet service was available to 72% of Nova Scotian communities, which comprised about 80 per cent of the population. It was estimated by the Nova Scotia Department of Economic and Rural Development that approximately 200,000 Nova Scotians, 93,500 dwellings, 213 schools, and 5,600 businesses did not have access to broadband services.

== Cumberland pilot project ==
In September 2006 the Nova Scotia government announced that it would undertake a pilot project to examine ways to bring affordable high-speed Internet service to rural areas. A 15 km area from Tidnish to Port Howe, Cumberland County, was chosen and the government invested $430,000 in the project. The province used a request for proposals to find a partner company to implement the pilot project.

In January 2007 Seaside Communications, a small cable TV company based on Cape Breton Island, won the contract to undertake the pilot project. It was completed by the summer of 2007. The province then issued Requests for Proposals for the delivery of broadband services to residents of seven zones it had created across the province.

== Technology ==
=== 900MHz Canopy vs. WiFi and 3G ===
With 700 MHz likely reserved in the US for emergency use, and home cordless phones, Wi-Fi and monitoring devices now in the 2.4 GHz and 5.8-6.0 GHz range, the 900 MHz band is underused and has good propagation and penetration characteristics. After the pilot projects proved this fact, the Motorola Canopy technology was evaluated against other wireless alternatives including 3G telco services and 802.11 based "Wi-Fi" services. However, Canopy has a maximum download speed well under 5 Mbit/s, less than one-third the speed of the Eastlink cable wired service (15 Mbit/s), and an upload speed less than half that.

== Project launch and progress ==
In October 2007, the Government of Canada confirmed that it was contributing to the Broadband for Rural Nova Scotia initiative. The $75 million investment was cost-shared by the federal government ($14.5 million), the provincial government ($19.5 million) and the companies contracted to deliver the service ($41 million).

In December 2007, the province signed contracts with two Internet service providers, Bragg Communications (EastLink) and Seaside Communications to serve most of rural Nova Scotia.

Seaside Communications signed contracts to deliver broadband services to residents of the counties of: Cumberland, Colchester, Guysborough, Antigonish, Pictou and all of the island of Cape Breton.

Eastlink signed contracts to deliver broadband services to residents of the counties of Lunenburg, Queens, Shelburne, Yarmouth, Digby, Annapolis, Kings, and Hants.

The following August 2008, the province signed a third contract with Omniglobe Networks to deliver high speed services to rural Halifax Regional Municipality.

In November 2009, both Seaside Communications and Eastlink admitted they were not going to be able to complete their portions of the project by the deadline of December 31, 2009. This resulted in public calls for the Province to invoke penalty clauses of both the Eastlink and Seaside contracts for failure to meet their timeline commitments. Omniglobe Networks however was finished by the deadline and was in the process of upgrading services to higher speeds as of May 2010.

Eastlink projected its completion date to be the end of May 2010, however in mid-June they acknowledged that a number of customers were still without access, and it would be up to six more weeks before they would be connected. EastLink declined to provide how many customers were still without access. Seaside Communications had stated its work would be completed by the end of summer (September) 2010; as of December 31, 2010 this pledge has still not been fulfilled.

== Initial case studies ==
In its early phases the program was described as a success by Motorola itself and other sources. Seaside and Omniglobe were generally successful at their objectives with some criticism generally of the wireless technology rather than the providers. Over 400 structures were erected, according to Motorola.

However, Eastlink failed to reach at least 800 addresses in South west Nova Scotia by April 2012 and still failed to reach 600 two years later. It was given a deadline of December 31, 2014

== 2010s ==
=== 2015 usage controversy ===
In July 2015 Eastlink announced both that it would not upgrade its repeater towers and that it intended to charge users per gigabyte, a widely unpopular move that was directly criticized by the government itself.

=== 2016 Provincial budget provision ===
The Nova Scotia budget of 2016 included a CAD$6 million provision to enhance high-speed internet to the province's rural communities.

=== Internet for Nova Scotia Initiative ===
In 2018, Nova Scotia established its Internet for Internet for Nova Scotia Initiative, from CAD$193 million in funding the province allocated to the independent Nova Scotia Internet Funding Trust.
