= Cambium Networks =

Wireless broadband provider

Cambium Networks Corporation
- Type: Public
- Traded as: Nasdaq: CMBM; Russell 2000 Index component
- Industry: Telecommunications
- Predecessor: Motorola (Canopy)
- Founded: 2011; 15 years ago
- Headquarters: Hoffman Estates, Illinois, United States
- Area served: Worldwide
- Key people: Morgan Kurk (president and CEO)
- Revenue: ▲US$335.9 million (2022)
- Number of employees: 700
- Subsidiaries: Xirrus Wi-Fi
- Website: cambiumnetworks.com

Cambium Networks Corporation is an American manufacturer of wireless telecommunications equipment, including Enterprise WiFi, Network switch, Internet of Things, and fixed wireless broadband and Wi-Fi for enterprises products for Internet access. Publicly traded on the NASDAQ stock exchange, it spun out of Motorola in October 2011.

On the 10th September 2026, Cambium Networks filed for Chapter 11 bankruptcy and shed just under 54% of jobs globally. The UK based subsidiary, Cambium Networks Limited appointed administrators and all assets are frozen, awaiting sale.

As noted on the Cambium Networks website: "On Wednesday, October 14, 2026, Univastu India Limited completed the acquisition of Cambium Networks. The acquisition includes the ePMP™ and Enterprise businesses, and of particular importance, cnMaestro™ Network Management. Cambium Networks will operate as a standalone subsidiary of Univastu."

== Products ==
Cambium Networks manufactures point-to-point backhaul, point-to-multipoint communication wide area network (WAN), Wi-Fi indoor and outdoor access, and cloud-based network management systems. In 2020, the company collaborated with Facebook to add mesh networking technology Terragraph that allows high-speed internet connections where laying fiber optic cable is not viable. As of 2021 the company has shipped 10 million radios.

Products are available in point-to-point and point-to-multipoint configurations. Its cnWave fixed wireless solution provides multi-gigabit throughputs. It includes both the original Motorola-designed products using the Canopy protocol and the PtP backhauls that were rebranded from Orthogon Systems, which Motorola acquired in 2006. Cambium Networks’ solutions are used by broadband service providers and managed service providers to connect business and residential locations in dense urban, suburban, rural and remote locations, including education and healthcare. Campgrounds, RV parks and holiday parks have deployed Cambium Networks' fixed wireless and Wi-Fi for high-speed connectivity.

=== Enterprise Wi-Fi and Switching ===
Cambium Networks also manufactures Wireless LAN (WLAN) Wi-Fi access points including Wi-Fi 6E and intelligent switches along with cloud-management systems. In 2022, Spectralink added interoperability with Cambium Networks access points and Wi-Fi phones and handsets as part of its enterprise wireless certification program.

== History ==
Cambium Networks was created when Motorola Solutions sold the Canopy and Orthogon businesses in 2011. Cambium evolved the platform and expanded it to three product lines: Point to Point (PTP) (formerly Orthogon), Point to Multipoint (PMP) (formerly Canopy) and ePMP. In July 2019, Cambium acquired Xirrus from Riverbed Technology. In June 2019, the company listed on the NASDAQ Stock Exchange in an initial public offering that raised $70 million. WISPA network operator members voted Cambium Networks the “Manufacturer of the Year” from 2017-2020.

The technology competes with WiMAX, LTE and other long range mobile products, but not effectively with wired Internet, which is capable of much faster speeds and does not have wireless relay round-trip delay. Competent Canopy implementations such as the Broadband for Rural Nova Scotia initiative however have demonstrated VoIP, gaming and other low-latency applications work acceptably over this system, and in areas of challenging weather including high wind conditions (which cause antennas to move and affect connections).

=== Typical setup ===
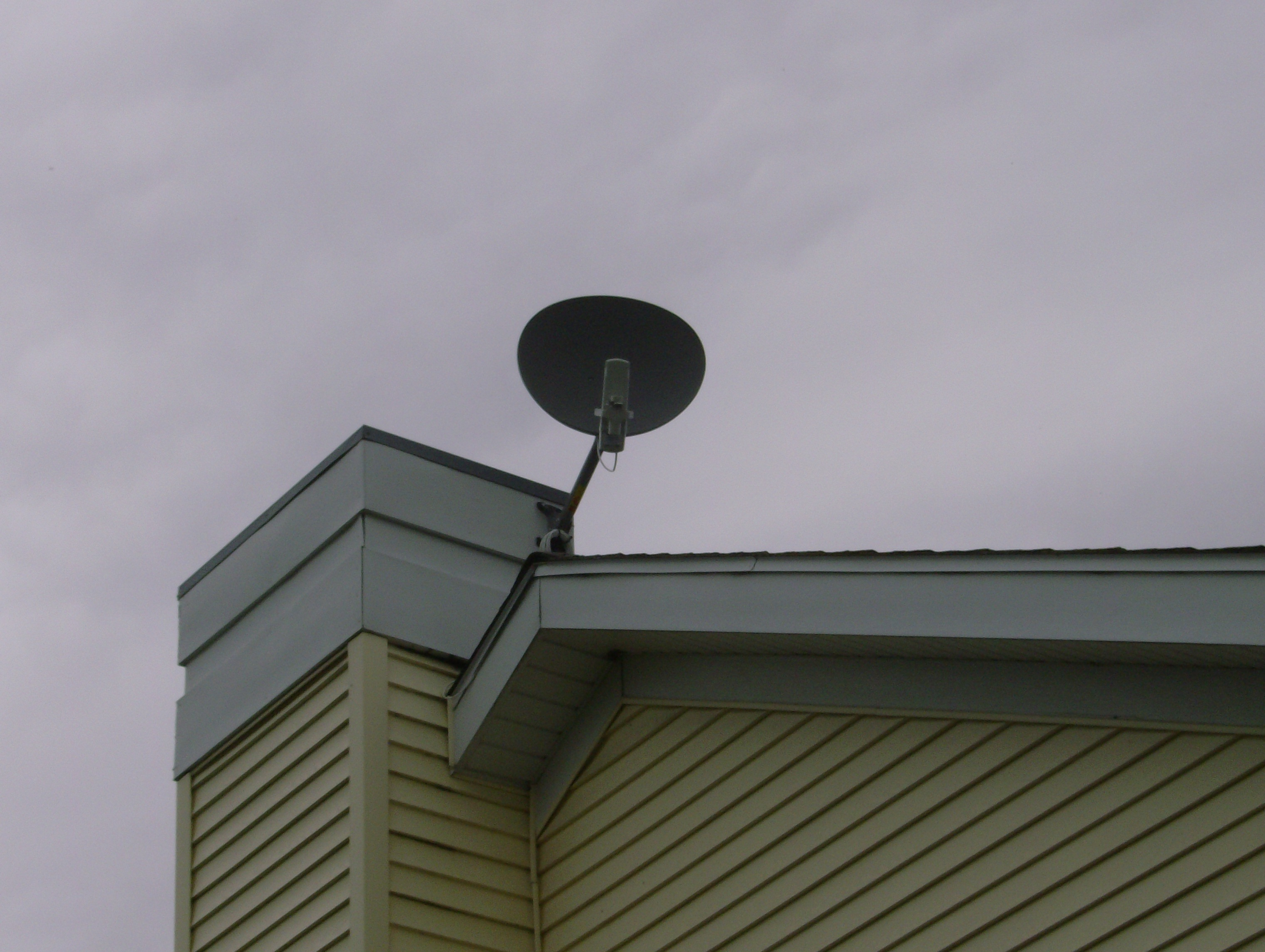
A 2.4 GHz Subscriber Module with Reflector Dish

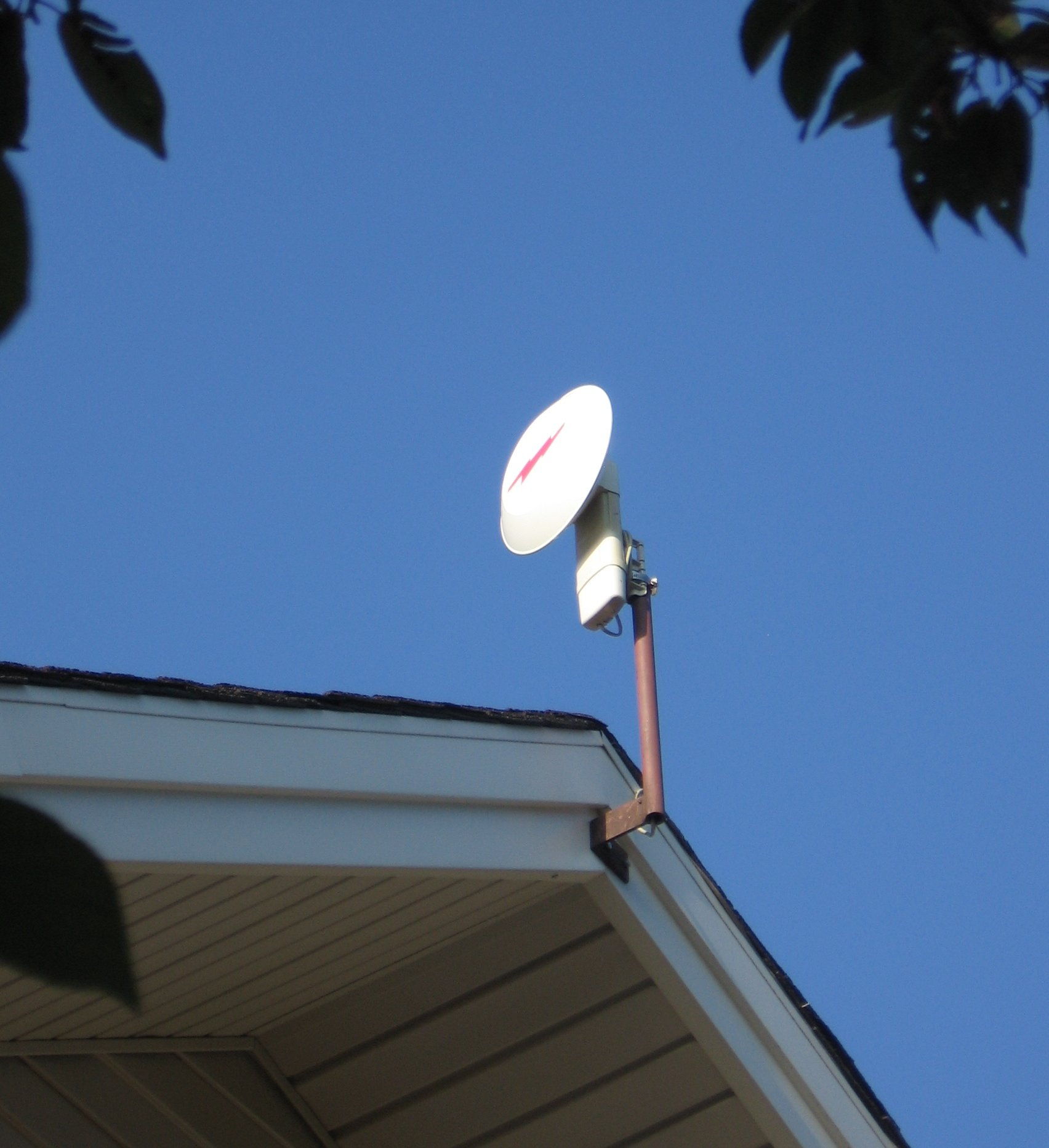
A 5.2 GHz Subscriber Module with a 'Stinger' Passive Antenna

A typical Canopy setup consists of a cluster of up to six co-located standard access points (AP), each with a 60 degree horizontal beamwidth antenna, to achieve 360 degree coverage. The most commonly used APs are available in 120, 180, or 360 degree models for site-based coverage, thus decreasing the number of APs needed on a tower. Also included would be one or more backhauls or otherwise out-of-band links (to carry data to/from other network occasions) and a Cluster Management Module (CMM) to provide power and synchronization to each Canopy AP or Backhaul Module (BM).

Customers of the system receive service through subscriber modules (SM) aimed towards the AP. The SMs should be mounted on the highest point of a building to get a reliable connection; otherwise, Fresnel zone obstruction will weaken the signal. Under ideal operating conditions, the system can communicate over distances of 3.5 to 15 miles (5.6 to 24.1 km) depending on the frequency using equipment with integrated antennas. Network operators can opt to install reflector dishes or Stinger antennas or to use Canopy models that accept external antennas at one or both ends of the link to increase coverage distance.

Most Canopy equipment receives its power using Power over Ethernet, however, none of its standards comply with IEEE 802.3af. A customer can query the status of their SM by viewing URL 169.254.1.1/main.cgi with a web browser (unless the network operator uses a different IP address or has put the subscriber in a VLAN.

In general, the 900 MHz version is more effective for use in outlying areas because of its ability to penetrate trees. However, it requires careful installation because of the easy propagation of interference on that band. Other frequencies currently available are 2.4 GHz, 5.2 GHz, 5.4 GHz, and 5.7 GHz.

=== Comparison with other wireless networking systems ===
While Cambium offers products that support the Wi-Fi protocols (mostly the cnPilot range and the products from its Xirrus acquisition), most of its outdoor, long-range products function exclusively with the proprietary TDMA Canopy or Cambium protocols on custom FPGA code. These are heavily optimized for GPS synchronization, frequency re-use, low latency and long distances / high interference survival.

The versions of this protocol include:

- PMP100 - FSK based system which works on 8Mhz (on 900mhz) or 20Mhz channels (on 2.4Ghz, 5Ghz). Offers <5 mbps on 900mhz or <14 mbps on the other frequencies.
- PMP320 - WiMAX 802.16e-based system, which came from its Nextnet acquisition therefore has architecture differences from most of the other products. 3Ghz band only and 5/7/10mhz channels, offers up to 45 mbps throughput at the 10Mhz channel size but that was rarely achieved.
- PMP400 - first OFDM-based product, 10Mhz channels, up to 20 Mbps speeds. 5ghz band only.
- PMP430 - evolution of OFDM, channel size 5/10/20Mhz, up to 50 Mbps speeds at the largest channel size. 5ghz band only.
- PMP450 - large family of OFDM products. 900Mhz, 2.4Ghz / 3Ghz / 5Ghz band coverage, 5-40Mhz channel sizes. Can do 200 Mbps+ at 40Mhz channels. The Medusa MU-MIMO Access points allow multiple streams simultaneously, therefore can achieve 1 Gbps+ of throughput split between multiple customers in a 40Mhz channel.
- "Orthogon" protocols - these came from the Orthogon Systems acquisition. The protocols have a large number of subcarriers allowing powerful non-line-of sight abilities. The 5Ghz-only product families include PTP400 (OS-Gemini), PTP600 (OS-Spectra), PTP300/500 and PTP 650/670/700. These families are not protocol-compatible with each other, and some different products have intra-family protocol compatibility limitations. In comparison, the PTP250 was an early Wi-Fi chipset attempt and the PTP550 is an ePMP-based product.
- ePMP - this is the value line, unlike the others these are based on commodity Wi-Fi chipsets, with the advanced protocol implemented in software. The PPS numbers are lower but still far in excess of competitive Wi-Fi-based products. It maintains the advantages including GPS synchronization and frequency re-use. They offer 10/20/40/80Mhz channel size support, with 160Mhz in development.

These products are fixed wireless technology. Canopy protocol products have many advantages over Wi-Fi and other wireless local area network protocols:

- Transmission timing is explicitly controlled, so that all access points (AP) on all towers can be synchronized by cluster management modules (CMM) to prevent interference. APs of the same band can be placed right next to each other, and back-to-back units can use exactly the same frequency.
- Designed for wireless internet service provider (WISP) use; polling-based (prevents one subscriber module from "hogging" bandwidth), excellent interference rejection and easy management.
- Simple to install and configure.
- TDMA system and optimized radio design allowing long-range communications, often 10 km+

Their main disadvantages are:

- Proprietary
- Less reliable than wired systems

== See also ==
- Wireless local loop
