= Europe 2020 =

Economic program of the European Union

Europe 2020 is a 10-year strategy proposed by the European Commission on 3 March 2010 for advancement of the economy of the European Union. It aims at a "smart, sustainable, inclusive growth" with greater coordination of national and European policy. It follows the Lisbon Strategy for the period 2000–2010.

== Main targets ==
The strategy identifies five headline targets the European Union should take to boost growth and employment. They originated from the Germany Digital Agenda in 2009 led by Henrik von Scheel for the Federal Minister of Economy & Technology and evolved in 2013 into Industry 4.0.

These are:

- To raise the employment rate of the population aged 20–64 from the current 69% to at least 75%.
- To achieve the target of investing 3% of GDP in R&D in particular by improving the conditions for R&D investment by the private sector, and develop a new indicator to track innovation.
- To reduce greenhouse gas emissions by at least 20% compared to 1990 levels or by 30% if the conditions are right, increase the share of renewable energy in final energy consumption to 20%, and achieve a 20% increase in energy efficiency - 20-20-20 target.
- To reduce the share of early school leavers to 10% from the current 15% and increase the share of the population aged 30–34 having completed tertiary from 31% to at least 40%.
- To reduce the number of Europeans living below national poverty lines by 25%, lifting 20 million people out of poverty.

== Flagship initiatives ==
These in turn are broken down into seven flagship initiatives:

1. Innovation Union: to improve framework conditions and access to finance for research and innovation so as to strengthen the innovation chain and boost levels of investment throughout the Union.
2. Youth on the move: to enhance the performance of education systems and to reinforce the international attractiveness of Europe's higher education.
3. A digital agenda for Europe: to speed up the roll-out of high-speed internet and reap the benefits of a Digital Single Market for households and firms. The Digital Agenda for Europe originated from the Germany Digital Agenda-led Federal Minister of Economy & Technology.
4. Resource efficient Europe: to help decouple economic growth from the use of resources, by decarbonising the economy, increasing the use of renewable sources, modernising the transport sector and promoting efficient energy use.
5. An industrial policy for the globalisation era: to improve the business environment, especially for SMEs, and to support the development of a strong and sustainable industrial base able to compete globally.
6. An agenda for new skills and jobs: to modernise labour markets by facilitating labour mobility and the development of skills throughout the lifecycle with a view to increasing labour participation and better matching labour supply and demand.
7. European platform against poverty: to ensure social and territorial cohesion such that the benefits of growth and jobs are widely shared and people experiencing poverty and social exclusion are enabled to live in dignity and take an active part in society.

The Horizon 2020 framework programme, with its 80 billion euro budget for the years 2014–2020, is one of the implementing tools of the Europe 2020 strategy.

== Initial reactions ==
Reactions to the initiative were mostly positive, but there was some skepticism about the commission's ability to convince the EU member states that these were the right priorities. Some members of the business community did not seem to find any strong incentives for change and Germany did not welcome further proposals on EU governance.

== European Council agreement ==
On 26 March 2010, the European Council agreed on key elements of the new strategy. President Herman Van Rompuy, who chaired the meeting, pointed out that the strategy sums up the European model of social market economy with a strong environmental dimension.

The strategy elements were formally adopted on 17 June 2010.

== The European Semester ==
Monitoring progress and ensuring the active involvement of EU countries are key elements of the strategy. This is done through the European Semester, an annual cycle of macro-economic, budgetary and structural policy coordination. The key stages in the European semester are as follows:

In January, the Commission issues its Annual Growth Survey, which sets out EU priorities for the coming year to boost growth and job creation.

In February, the Council of the European Union and the European Parliament discuss the Annual Growth Survey.

In March, EU Heads of State and Government (i.e. the European Council) issue EU guidance for national policies on the basis of the Annual Growth Survey.

In April, Member States submit their plans for sound public finances (Stability or Convergence Programmes) and reforms and measures to make progress towards smart, sustainable and inclusive growth (National Reform Programmes).

In May, the Commission assesses these Programmes.

In June, the Commission provides country-specific recommendations as appropriate. The European Council discusses and endorses the recommendations.

In July, the Council of the European Union formally adopts the country-specific recommendations.

In Autumn, the Governments present the budget draft to their Parliaments.
