= Cybera =

- Formerly: WURCNet, Netera Alliance
- Company type: Not-for-profit
- Industry: Telecommunications network
- Headquarters: Calgary, Alberta
- Key people: Barb Carra (President & CEO)
- Website: www.cybera.ca

Cybera is a not-for-profit corporation responsible for the operation of Alberta's Optical Regional Advanced Network. This network, known as CyberaNet, connects Alberta's research universities, colleges, K-12 schools, not-for-profits, and business incubators to one another and to the global grid of research and education networks using optical fibre. Cybera is funded by grants and its membership. The head office is located in the University of Calgary Research Park, with an additional office in downtown Edmonton.

== History ==
Cybera has roots in a 1980s movement to build high-speed data-transfer networks to support university research. The initial manifestation of this movement in Alberta was the Western Universities Research Consortium Network (WURCNet). By the mid 1990s, Canada's western provinces each evolved a need for their own organizations. Alberta created Netera Alliance, while other western provinces created partner network organizations. In 2006, Netera Alliance expanded its mandate and changed its name to Cybera.

== Overview ==
Cybera is a not-for-profit corporation governed by a Board of Directors which includes representatives from the fields of education, research, government, and industry. With offices in Calgary and Edmonton, Cybera maintains indefeasible rights of use on network links for research and education purposes in the province of Alberta. Cybera also partners with researchers and the private sector on projects that explore digital technologies including cloud computing and next-generation networking, and provides above-the-network services to members.

== Projects and Services ==
- Internet Buying Group: By pooling members' internet traffic, Cybera negotiates a bulk bandwidth rate from commercial Internet Service Providers to provide members with high-speed internet services at a reduced cost.
- Peering
- DAIR - Digital Accelerator for Innovation and Research: A cloud-computing testbed for ICT projects, targeting small and medium Canadian enterprises.
- Rapid Access Cloud: Free cloud computing resources for up to one year to Alberta-based academics, researchers, non-profits and small to medium-sized organizations that are not covered by the national DAIR program. It is intended to reduce the time it takes small and medium-sized enterprises to prototype, test and validate new ideas and bring products to market.
- CyberSKA: A Canadian initiative to build a software platform that can handle data sets from one of the world's biggest science initiatives - the Square Kilometre Array radio telescope.
- Shared services

== Regional Partners ==
Cybera works in co-operation with CANARIE and the high-speed fibre-optic networks in Canada's provinces and territories known as Optical Regional Advanced Networks (ORANs):

- Yukon: Yukon College
- Northwest Territories: Aurora College
- British Columbia: BCNET
- Saskatchewan: Saskatchewan Research Network (SRnet)
- Manitoba: MRNet
- Ontario: Ontario Research and Innovation Optical Network (ORION)
- Quebec: Réseau d'informations scientifiques du Québec (RISQ)
- New Brunswick & Prince Edward Island: NB/PEI Educational Computer Network (University of New Brunswick and University of Prince Edward Island)
- Nova Scotia: Atlantic Canada Organization of Research Networks (ACORN-NS)
- Newfoundland and Labrador: Atlantic Canada Organization of Research Networks (ACORN-NL)

Cybera also connects the supercomputers, managed by WestGrid and Compute Canada, used to carry out Alberta's high-performance computing.
