= Internet in Canada =

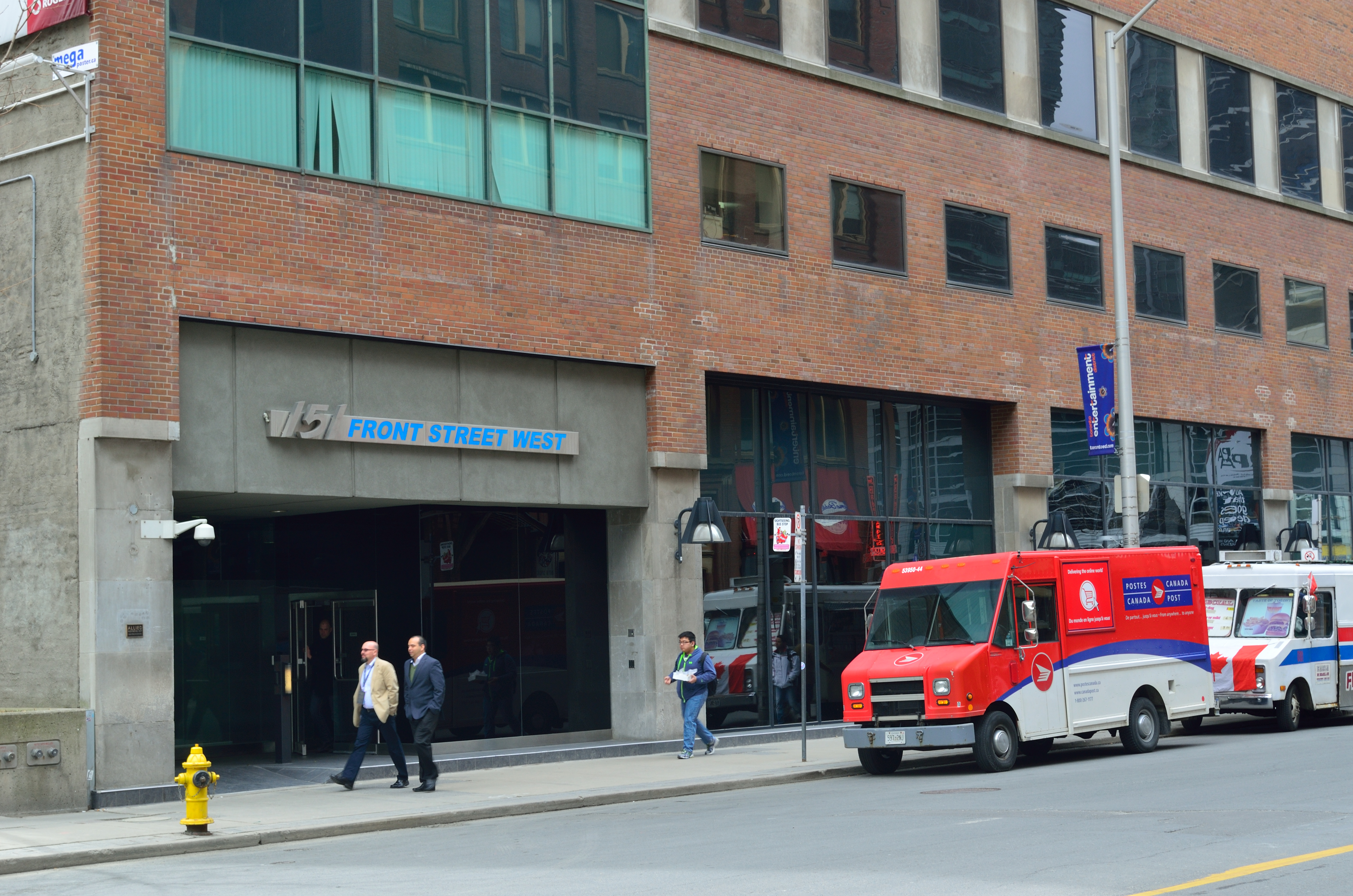
Toronto Internet Exchange, Canada's largest Internet Exchange Point.

Canada ranks as 28th in the world for Internet usage with an estimated 35.34 million users or 93% of the population as of 2021. According to Harvard researchers, Canada has some of the lowest internet standards among OECD countries, as a result of high costs and slow internet speeds.

== Web use ==
According to the CIRA 2013 Factbook, Canadians spend more time online than anyone else in the world—an average of 45 hours a month. They also watch more online video, with an average of 300 views per month in 2011.

In 2013, the most popular websites in Canada were major sites such as Google Search, Facebook, and YouTube. The 17th most popular website, Pornhub, is headquartered in Montreal, Quebec.

The most popular native Canadian websites are the major Canadian news media companies, which maintain an extensive web presence. According to a February 2008 report by comScore, the most popular Canadian sites are Quebecor Media, principally Canoe.ca, followed closely by CTVglobemedia which includes globeandmail.com and CTV.ca.

== History ==
Canada's DATAPAC was the world's first public data network designed specifically for X.25 when it opened for use in 1976.

A 1983 project to network approximately 20 Canadian universities was initiated and driven at the University of Guelph by a small team including Bob McQueen, Kent Percival and Peter Jaspers-Fayer with the aim to share files and transfer emails. The IBM mainframe RSCS protocol was originally intended to connect remote printers and card readers to mainframes, but was easily adapted to this new networking use of file sharing and email forwarding. Dedicated telecommunication lines, typically 2400 bits per second, were leased point to point between neighboring universities, with each university paying the cost of one leased line to its nearest neighbor.

The scheme came after the development of the BITNET network in the United States which used the same protocols. An interconnection between the Canadian cluster of universities, called NetNorth, and the larger and quickly growing BITNET network in the US was negotiated and made operational at the startup in 1984. Before the end of the following year, coast-to-coast connectivity to BITNET was in place, 100 years to the day of the last spike being driven on the cross-Canada railroad. Other gateways were developed to interconnect with ARPAnet, CSNET, NSFNET (in 1989) and others. The early adopting Canadian universities were soon able to connect to many thousands of computer network nodes in the USA and internationally. This gatewayed international "network of networks" came to be known as the Internet.

== File sharing ==
In general, the unauthorized copying or distribution of copyrighted material, whether for profit or for personal use, is illegal under Canada's Copyright Act. However, certain exemptions are made for fair dealing copying of small portions of copyrighted works, for activities such as private study, criticism, and news reporting. Furthermore, the Act allows that the copying of sound recordings of musical works for the personal use is not copyright infringement. This is supported by a levy on blank recording media, which is distributed to record labels and musicians, although not evenly. While the unauthorized downloading or uploading of complete copyrighted works such as books, movies, or software is illegal under the Act, the situation regarding music files is more complex.

== Fibre optic networks ==
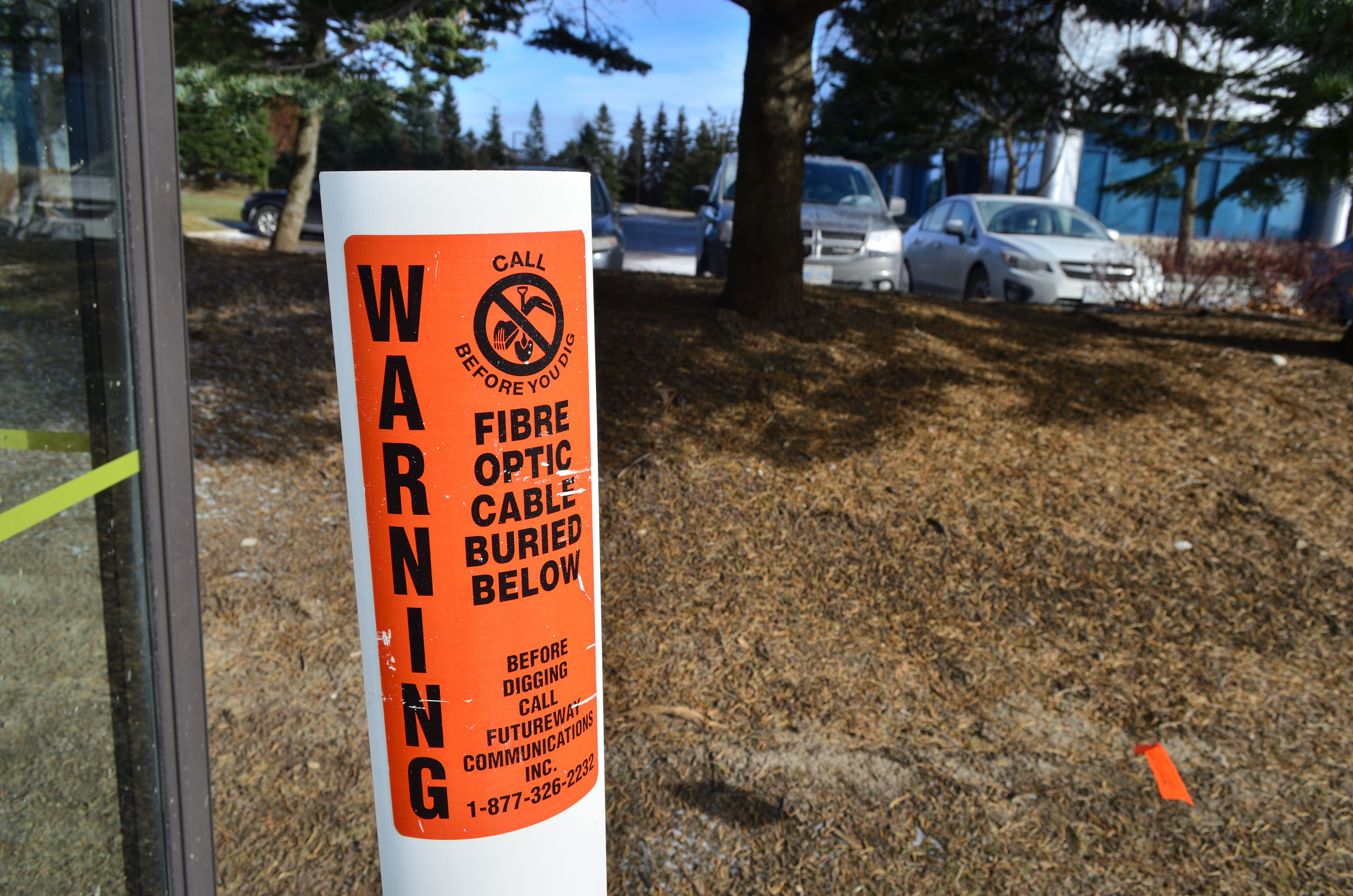
Rogers FCI Broadband fibre optic buried in Ontario.

Multiple providers, including Bell Canada and Rogers Communications in Eastern Canada, Telus Internet in BC and Alberta, and SaskTel in Saskatchewan have made investments into upgrading their infrastructure to provide last mile fibreoptic connectivity, or fibre to the home (FTTH). In December 2016, local company MNSi Telecom announced a $35 million fibre build in Windsor, Ontario.

In July 2015, the CRTC ruled that major telecoms providing fibre to the home must allow smaller providers to purchase wholesale access to their networks. Bell Canada attempted to oppose the ruling, but failed.

== Comparison ==
Regional Canadian ISPs peer through a few major Internet exchange points, the most notable of which is the Toronto Internet Exchange. However, these regional networks usually share the same backbones for longer distance connectivity.

The largest DSL provider in Canada is Bell Internet (formerly Bell Sympatico). Bell owns and maintains physical layer connectivity through a combination of optical fibre networks, DSLAM and Customer Premises Equipment. In British Columbia (BC), Alberta (AB), and parts of Quebec (QC), the incumbent telco is Telus, owning the DSLAMs and fibre, providing many of the same services Bell does.

The other major players offering DSL and IPTV services are SaskTel in Saskatchewan and Manitoba Telecom Services (MTS) in Manitoba. Download speeds are up to 25 Mbit/s for average users, though recent upgrades now make HDTV and much higher rates possible.

For cable offerings, standard North American DOCSIS based equipment are used. The largest cable internet providers in Canada are Shaw Communications (Western) and Rogers Cable (Eastern) offering internet speeds of up to 1000 Mbit/s.

== Usage-based billing ==
Internet bandwidth limits and caps are considered by many to be too restrictive, due to the increasing popularity of online streaming media services such as Netflix, which require large amounts of bandwidth.

The decision to impose bandwidth caps on smaller independent ISPs caused controversy in 2011 when the Canadian Radio-television and Telecommunications Commission (CRTC), Canada's telecommunications regulator, approved a request by Bell Internet to begin, on March 1, 2011, to apply a bandwidth cap on the users of smaller independent ISPs who use Bell's last mile infrastructure. This new billing structure is called "usage-based billing" or UBB.

Bell pushed for a cap as small as 25 gigabytes of transfer per month, plus a $1–2 CAD surcharge for every GB over the limit. The stated intent was to prevent the customers of independent ISPs from congesting Bell's network, because many independent ISPs offer service with unlimited bandwidth, while most major Canadian ISPs do not. The CRTC was criticized for allowing Bell to use anti-competitive practices to favour its own Internet and television offerings. Bell is also under fire for forcing its own pricing structure and business on its wholesalers. Bell admits that more than 10 percent of its subscribers (at the time of said download cap) exceed their limit, resulting in additional billing.

Many savvy Internet users also accuse Bell of falsifying information to the public regarding network congestion. Network congestion is primarily caused by many users accessing the Internet at the same time (after school/work, 5pm–10pm) and not by heavy users alone. Similar criticism was levied when Eastlink Rural Connect applied UBB in July 2015, which many users reported made peak time congestion worse. See Broadband for Rural Nova Scotia initiative for this and related wireless broadband congestion problems.

On February 2, 2011, industry minister Tony Clement and Prime Minister Stephen Harper called on the CRTC to reverse the decision. The next day, the CRTC announced that it would delay its decision by 60 days.

There are some supporters for usage-based-billing (UBB) at lower rates instead of the current $2/GB. One example is TekSavvy, providing "Lite" cable Internet services (6 Mbit/s down, ¼ Mbit/s up) at $30.95/month with 300 GB, equivalent to around 10¢/GB. Rogers Hi-Speed Internet offers Internet access at the same speed for $41.49/month but with only 20 GB, equivalent to around $2.07/GB. The difference of $1.97/GB between the two providers is one key reason why consumer advocates oppose UBB. Some also claim that it costs the incumbents as low as 3¢/GB.

Supporters also suggest that instead of a penalty-based system (heavy users pay more), a credit-based system (light users be credited back monthly) would be much more consumer friendly and fair.

== Digital divide ==
The digital divide in Canada refers to the discrepancy that exists between Canadians who have access to information and communication technologies (ICT) and the benefits they provide compared to those who do not. This divide can be the result of many factors, including high costs for technology and online access, differences in the availability of online connectivity resources in different locations across the country, and lacking digital literacy. The digital divide in Canada also stems from income inequality among Canadians and differences in online practices exhibited by those of different age, gender, first language, and cultural background.

The digital divide is greatest in Northern Canada due to the economic and geographical obstacles to setting up high speed internet connections between distant and sparsely populated towns, along with some residents' low digital literacy rates and lack of access to technology.

Various government initiatives are currently being implemented to reduce the digital divide in Canada, including plans aimed at providing all Canadians with affordable high speed internet packages, increasing the amount of free public Wi-Fi available, and the improvement of digital literacy among students in public elementary and high schools.

== Web browsers ==
As of 2024, most used web browsers according to Statcounter were:

Web browser	Market share	Reference
Chrome	49%	
Safari	33%	
Edge	7.8%	
Firefox	3.8%	
Samsung Internet	2.4%	
Opera	0.99%	
Android	0.36%	
Explorer	0.22%	
Mozilla	0.07%	
other	0.32%	

As of 2024, most used web browsers according to Cloudflare were:

Web browser	Market share	Reference
Chrome	56%	
Safari	24%	
Edge	9.4%	
Firefox	5.0%	
Samsung Internet	2.1%	
Brave	1.0%	
Opera	0.97%	
Aloha Browser	0.30%	
DuckDuckGo Private Browser	0.27%	
Oculus Browser	0.04%	
AVG Secure Browser	0.04%	
Avast Secure Browser	0.03%	

== See also ==
- List of internet service providers in Canada
- List of Canadian mobile phone companies
- Censorship in Canada § Internet
- Science and technology in Canada
- Social networking in Canada
- Demographics of the Canadian political blogosphere
- Broadband for Rural Nova Scotia initiative
- CANARIE – national research and education network
  - ACORN-NS, MERLIN, ORION, RISQ, SRNet – provincial research and education networks in Canada
- Canadian Internet Registration Authority – Canada's top-level domain registrar in charge of .ca
