= Canadian political blogosphere =

The Canadian political blogosphere includes political commentary using any social media technology. Its culture differs from that of Europe or the US. The term 'blogosphere' was first formed colloquially in 1999, and has since evolved to mean "the cultural or intellectual environment in which blogs are written and read."

In Canada, the 'blog' employs a vast array of social media technology. This includes traditional forms of individual blogging hosted through personal websites or blogging tools such as Blogger or Tumblr, and has also come to include micro-blogging platforms such as Twitter. In Canada, blogging has more recently been adopted by the mainstream media. By necessity, these traditional forms of news media aspire to retain a voice in an increasingly globalized public sphere. Presently, three of Ontario's major newspapers (The Toronto Star, The Globe and Mail, and The National Post) retain a roster of bloggers, each providing commentary on current events.

== Political blogs ==
A primary player in this new rapid-fire culture of information sharing is the 'political blog,' a term use to describe any blog that provides written commentary on current political news and events. Scholar Antoinette Pole views the political blog as a "prominent agent driving many rapid changes...[and] fundamentally transforming politics and civic engagement." In the United States, a country of increasingly polarized mainstream ideologies, Pole acknowledges that blogging is a phenomenon that may only make these differences more problematic. However, in Canada, a country where political divides are often less clear-cut, the atmosphere surrounding political blogging is entirely different and lines are more blurred. The dominant demographics and ideologies of the Canadian political blogosphere are different enough from their Western counterparts to merit their own course of study.

=== Variety of opinion ===
The views purveyed throughout the Canadian political blogosphere are as varied as the nation from which they stem. Despite this, particular demographics and ideologies are, as they are in any geography (material or not), inevitably more dominant than others, and definitively indicative of a specific intellectual culture. This is evident in an investigation of the dominant demographics and ideologies of blogs that are political in nature. Various studies initiated in Canada have made it clear that the vast majority of those who blog from a political perspective tend to write from the right-of-centre on the political spectrum. The immense growth and popularity of the Canadian political blogosphere is the complex product of particular demographics and ideologies, as well as a natural response to what Marshall McLuhan described as the global village or, perhaps more poetically in his hallmark text "Understanding Media: The Extensions of Man", as technological "extensions of consciousness."

== The Demographics of the Canadian blogosphere ==
=== Age ===
Canadian political bloggers occupy an older age demographic than regular internet users, and the rest of the general blogosphere. In 2004, the Massachusetts Institute of Technology surveyed nearly 500 bloggers from forty different countries. The research found that one half of individuals who said they blogged regularly were between the ages of 21 and 30. Perhaps more surprisingly, one third of individuals surveyed indicated they were between the ages of 31 and 40.

Some data also exists that aims to identify the dominant demographics of readers and writers of political blogs. In 2006 a survey was put forth by advertising company 'blogads' that obtained approximately 36,000 responses from bloggers and blog readers worldwide (including a small percentage of Canadians). 22 percent of respondents who described themselves as blog readers were between the ages of 31 and 40, while a 27 percent were between the ages of 41 and 50, and a startling 23 percent between the ages of 51 and 60. This data, in contrast to the MIT study above, suggests that political bloggers are on average older than the general blogosphere. The little available Canadian data on the subject is in accordance with the aforementioned international trends, with only 50 percent of Canadians who engage in blog-use being between the ages of 18 and 34.

=== Education ===
In Canada, 45 percent of readers and writers of blogs hold post-secondary degrees. Currently, the group that most commonly utilizes blog networks as news sources are students under the age of 25.

=== Background ===
Nearly 80 percent of Canadian bloggers are white.

=== Income ===
With the exception of students in the midst of pursuing higher education, readers and writers of blogs in Canada tend to be in middle to high income brackets. A 2005 Ipsos-Reid survey found blogging to be most popular among individuals with an annual income of $60,000 a year or more. This can be seen to exist in correlation with the above data on bloggers and education.

=== Gender imbalance ===
The gender imbalance amongst users of the Canadian blogosphere is striking. Nearly half of Canadian men report they regularly engage with the blogosphere as content-producers or as readers, while only 35 percent of women report the same. This gender discrepancy seen in the Canadian blogosphere mirrors the blogging demographics of other Western nations. Of the 500 respondents to the aforementioned international 2004 MIT study, only 36 percent of respondents identified as female.

Puzzlingly, this data exists in contradiction to the gender demographics of Canadian users in forms of other social media. Ipsos-Reid's 2009 research titled "What? You Don't Have a Social Network Profile? You Are Now in the Minority" indicates that in Canadian spheres of social media such as Facebook and Myspace, genders are evenly matched with the percentage of female users at times exceeding their male counterparts. On an international level, 53 percent of micro-blogging tool Twitter's users are reported to be female. Furthermore, Statistics Canada's biannual data of Canadian internet usage reveals that comparable percentages of men and women report having regular internet access to the internet at home.

The participatory imbalance between male and female Canadian bloggers could be the result of a multitude of factors. The most simple explanation results from an examination of the Canadian blogosphere's gender demographics in tandem with existing statistics on blogger education levels, and average age. Given that Canadian blog users are generally a) in older age brackets in comparison to those who access the internet for general purposes, and b) on average hold higher levels of education than casual internet users (see above), it might be that the progression of time will see a narrowing of the educational gap between men and women. With this closure, and as more women come to mirror the educational demographics of Canadian bloggers, it is possible that the gap between genders in the blogosphere will close also.

Given that the gender gap is also evident from studies of the American and other international blogospheres, a study of female political bloggers internationally is pertinent. In "Blogging the Political" scholar Antoinette Pole notes that the gap between male and female political bloggers is quite pronounced. In offering explanations for this disparity, Pole indicates that 75 percent of women who blog politically say they regularly face challenges in the blogosphere specific to their gender. These challenges may explain the lack of female political bloggers in the Canadian blogosphere. When taken into account that conservative political blogging accounts for a high percentage of all political blogging in Canada (see section titled 'Dominant Ideologies' for more), some conclusions for the lack of female political bloggers in Canada can be drawn. Pole believes that female conservative political bloggers face more challenges than their female liberal counterparts, writing that in the conservative blogosphere many women find they have great difficulty being taken seriously "on intellectual merit alone." Others reported backlash from readers in feminist communities. As conservative political blogging is more dominant in Canada, and since female conservative political bloggers face challenges specific to their ideologies, this may very well explain an element of the gender divide.

Furthermore, regardless of ideological grouping, the same study finds that the overwhelming majority of women in the political blogosphere are regular targets of sexism. Its author found that "due to limitations on space and pressure to attract large readerships" the mainstream media has a tendency to overlook, and under-reference, blogs written by women in favour of blog material written by men. She suggests that one reason mainstream media outlets do this is to pander to a predominantly male audience. Given that the mainstream Canadian media functions in largely the same business model as other major international media conglomerates, it is likely that the challenges described by female bloggers in Pole's study are equally applicable to the Canadian political blogosphere. Many individuals in the field of Media Studies find this gender gap to be extremely troubling, and symptomatic of the continued institutionalized alienation of women from the political arena.

== Dominant ideologies ==
Demographics indicate, along with a cursory study of the Canadian political blogosphere, that the dominant ideology is right of centre. A number of self-described conservative blog aggregates exist, the most dominant being the 'Blogging Tories' which includes more than 300 blogs from the political right. Most Canadian conservative blogging networks view themselves as an alternative voice to what they perceive to be the liberalism of the mainstream media. While the group believes that they have "helped to counter a media that is not very friendly to the party," one blogger notes that the blogging circle remains widely unknown outside of its own ideological sphere. The idea that the political right dominates the Canadian political blogosphere can also be seen in the views of other members of the Blogging Tories such as the blog Small Dead Animals, which ascribes to the view that Canadian conservatives "have been forced to listen while media and politicians alike have told me 'what Canadians think'...'You don't speak for me.'" Some content created by the Blogging Tories and Small Dead Animals has been criticized as offensive by others in the larger political blogosphere. The success of right-wing Canadian blogging lies in the belief held by the political right that they are a marginalized group within broader public discourse. To the individuals who comprise this subgroup of the Canadian blogosphere, right-wing political blogging is a means of fighting perceived oppression. This may explain its dominance.

While conservatism dominates political blogging in Canada, data analysis from Ryerson University's Infoscape Research Lab at the Centre for the Study of Social Media indicates that left of centre political blogs are gaining track. In a tool specifically created to visualize the activity levels of political bloggers by political party affiliation (NDP, Liberal, and Conservative) on a day-to-day basis, it is evident that the more left of centre partisan blogospheres remain equally, if not more, active in recent blogging activity. Though this data is at odds with that described in the previous paragraph, a few arguments can be made. It is possible that while conservative bloggers outnumber those who are ideologically left of centre, fewer conservative bloggers identify as partisan. Alternatively, perhaps more conservative blogs exist overall, but are accessed and posted to less frequently than the fewer left of centre political blogs. It may also be that Canada's political blogging trends are mirroring those in Australia where a long-standing conservative government has fueled the numbers of left of centre bloggers- the emergence of more centre-left blogging in Canada may be a reaction to Stephen Harper's continued governance. Popular left-leaning blog aggregates include Liblogs and the New Democrats Online (now defunct).

== The new public sphere ==
In "The New Public Sphere: Global Civil Society, Communication Networks, and Global Governance," sociologist Manuel Castells discusses the implications of the globalization of communication on the traditional Public Sphere. While the Public Sphere has traditionally been defined as "a network for communication information and points of views," Castells argues that media has become an essential component. As a result of this, he says, "the networked society organizes itself on the basis of information networks." This reorganization of the Public Sphere has resulted in what is now commonly called the New Public Sphere. The facets of communication that comprise the New Public Sphere are elements of Web 2.0, and primarily social networking tools such micro-blogging site Twitter and traditional blogs. The political blogosphere has become integral to the Public Sphere, and is argued to be a tool of public discussion dominating the political process from which "people make up their minds on the issues that affect their lives."

It is evident that as discussion integral to political engagement begins to rely on digital methods of communication, the blogosphere expands accordingly. The New Public Sphere necessitates an increased popularity in political blogging in order to bridge the growing gap between traditional forms of media and new media. In a Canadian context, the concept that political blogging has become a more essential part of the political process the more Canada as a nation has become enmeshed in digital culture can be seen in recent data from the Canadian Media Research Consortium. A 2004-2007 report found that "Canadians are not among the world's major weblog consumers or contributors, ranking in the middle of this group in percentage reading blogs and contributing to them. The countries in which weblogs are most popular appear to be those where other forms of public discourse are limited. Nevertheless, blogging and related forms of social networking and online self-expression are growing in Canada." While the survey demonstrated that Canadians are not as frequent bloggers as individuals in other nations, it posits that there is a direct correlation between the amount of time that blogging is available as a technology and its level of absorption into Canadian culture. The same study notes that in Canada the "continued proliferation of [social networking and blogging] in the past three years" is indicative of its cultural appropriation.

== The necessary growth of the Canadian blogosphere ==
In recent years, the mainstream media has to respond to the inevitability of the growing divide between those who use traditional new sources, such as newspapers and television, and those who now acquire news from a digital setting. Marshall McLuhan noted that one medium is not immediately replaced by another; print culture replaced manuscript culture over the course of more than a century. The same can be said of traditional news media. In the traditional Public Sphere, for example, news that stemmed from televisions and newspapers functioned to provide the material for public discourse that would take place in a physical setting. However, in the previously discussed shift to the New Public Sphere, public discourse becomes increasingly enmeshed in the digitization of communication. While traditional forms of media for the near future remain the same, these same news sources have had to scramble to accommodate the digitization of public discourse. The predominant 'coping mechanism' the mainstream media has taken has been the introduction of blogs, and bloggers, to their production. These blogs, while still rooted in the traditional medium from which they stem, provide a bridge between tradition and the digital. It can therefore be seen, in extension of this, that the changing nature of the Public Sphere necessitates the introduction and growth of blogs in Canada as an alternative method of public discourse, particularly where this discourse concerns the political. The section below will briefly outline how a staple of traditional news media in Canada, CBC's The National, has responded to the demands of the digital age through their entry into the Canadian blogosphere.

=== CBC's The National ===
The CBC has taken measures since the mid-nineties to secure its place in the digital age of communication.

The CBC's hallmark news programme The National launched its first website in 1996, with the intention of creating a more interactive experience for its viewers. A 1996 television segment from the CBC's archives features an explanation of what a website is, and the suggestion that "the internet website [was] simply another way" to facilitate public discourse among the Canadian population. To accommodate discussion between viewers across Canada, a section of the website titled 'The National Feedback' was launched. This element was marketed as "a twenty-four hour interactive thread" that was continually being "improved and modified daily to serve you better." Essentially, The National had created a proto-blog, though the term did not yet exist to describe it as such. Viewers were free to comment on, and discuss amongst themselves, the content of the news they were receiving in a digital setting.

In October 2009 The National relaunched its website once more, this time incorporating a number of new interactive elements, including a blog. In the website's first ever blog post, the CBC's Bonnie Brown wrote "You've probably noticed already that our website looks different. We've launched a National blog, as well as a regular voting and comments feature...Our goal is to give our loyal viewers more choices of how, when and where they can watch The National's content, and we hope you take advantage of these new options." The re-launch of the website came alongside the programme's re-branding as a faster-paced and more 'modern' news source. The reasoning behind its relaunch was to better integrated the CBC into the oncoming digital age. On the day of the launch in its blog, Peter Mansbridge wrote that

Our work was focused on one central finding in the research: news viewers want the real story. They want to know what really happened and what it really means. They want our coverage to be unbiased, engaging and worth watching. They want smart. That was great news, because that's what we've always wanted too. The challenge for us, then, was to develop a strategy built more sharply around that goal.

From this, it can be ascertained that the remodeling of this long-running television programme was in response to market research that recognized the shift in the localization of the Public Sphere. It was no longer enough to stay relevant to public discourse as a traditional form of television news media, and so the CBC created a framework where they could remain participants in Canadian public discourse. In developing interactive forms of social media such as blogs and opening up communication in the digital realm, the CBC was able to become a more relevant element of the New Public Sphere. This example demonstrates how the shift of public discourse into the New Public Sphere necessitates and encourages the growth of public discourse in a Web 2.0 setting and, by extension, the expansion of the mainstream media into the political blogosphere. A dominant feature that bridges the divide between traditional news media (such as The National on television) and the impending digitization of communications (wherein people are accessing more news from a digital environment) has been in the form of blogging tools. It must, however, be considered that exactly how relevant the attempts by mainstream media sources (namely newspapers and broadcasters) are to the greater New Public Sphere is still a question to be answered. One scholar of media suggests that the "blogger employed by the major news organizations continue to operate under a different agenda from...political blogs." This study suggests that as long as mainstream media sources use Web 2.0 to raise their profiles among consumers instead of their level of engagement, their attempts to reestablish themselves as vital contributors of news and discussion in the digital age will remain futile.

== Theories of insular ideological groupings ==
A 2009 study of the larger global political blogosphere, with particular emphasis placed on Australia, revealed striking levels of insulation between political views at different measures of the political spectrum. It found evidence "for the gradual formation of polarized blog clusters around leading blogs on either side of the politics." The research goes on to suggest that gradually over time the ideological polarization of blog discussion becomes more pronounced as discussion ceases to be oriented around specific news articles, and becomes more oriented on the blog posts that stem from them. A visualization of this study reveals two clusters of political blogs on either side of the diagram- one cluster represents left-leaning blogs and the other right-leaning. The vast majority of discussion is insulated, with discourse only occasionally moving between ideological spheres. A 2009 American study demonstrated similar findings when link analysis studies found profound partisan segmentation in the political blogosphere. The authors cite the 2004 American presidential election, where a two-month-long analysis of 1,000 casual and 40 hugely influential political blogs preceding the election demonstrated that "in assessing blogrolls links and page citation links...91 percent...remained within partisan communities."

A similar analysis of insulated partisan blogging in Canada does not yet exist. However, given that both the United States and Australia share these characteristics, it is likely that ideologies within the Canadian political blogosphere also share similar polarizations. In a nation such as Canada major limbs of the mainstream media tend to have obvious political leanings, it can be argued that the same trend would most likely apply. For example, a left-of-centre individual would not normally be exposed to, interact with, and share news articles that stem from the Toronto Sun. A cursory glance of conservative blog aggregate the Blogging Tories is also indicative of polarizing trends within the Canadian political blogosphere. While anyone can request to become an affiliate of the Blogging Tories, the primary site requires its affiliates to "add conservative-related flash video content to your blog which will entice visitors to return to your site." This suggests that political blogging exists within an ideologically single-mind sphere of public discourse, and that little effort is made to initiate discussion with blogs that might not hold the same foundational beliefs. The polarizing communication that exists within political blogosphere also provides an explanation as to why it is so difficult to definitively, and quantitatively, ascertain which ideologies are more dominant than others: in the political blogosphere, studies demonstrate that readers primarily choose to engage only with blogs that share their own beliefs.

== See also ==
- Blogging Tories
- Canadian blogosphere
- Canadian online media
- Internet in Canada
- Progressive Bloggers
