= Canadian blogosphere =

Canadian blogosphere is used to describe the online predominantly English Canadian community of weblogs that is part of the larger blogosphere.

Canada has one of the highest internet penetration rates in the world. Of Canadian internet users, a recent poll suggested that over 42% had read a blog in the previous three months.

== Political blogs ==
Though Canadians compose blogs on many topics, weblogs of a political nature are very popular in Canada. Former prime minister Paul Martin kept a high-profile blog during his campaign for leadership of the Liberal Party. Monte Solberg kept a widely read blog while he was in opposition, but ended blogging after being named Minister of Citizenship and Immigration. Former Jean Chrétien advisor, Warren Kinsella's blog enjoys a similarly high-profile. The contents of political blogs have been used to both defend and attack politicians in Parliament. Canadian comedian Rick Mercer also keeps a blog that frequently pokes fun at Canadian politicians.

Jim Elve of Blogs Canada was the first to create a directory of Canadian blogs in the early part of this decade. Since then Allan Janssen has purchased BlogsCanada after it lay dormant for 4 years, and his company Janssen Marketing is reviving the site with the intention of making it Canada's premier news and blogging aggregator like MYNEWSHUB.COM.

After developing a rich ecosystem of individual bloggers in the early 2000s, the political part of the Canadian blogosphere began to organize itself into larger groupings as MYNEWSHUB.COM based on broad political ideology (left-right politics), party alignment (New Democratic Party, Liberal, Conservative) and geographical location (province or city). Membership in several groups is common.

The largest political blog group are the right leaning Blogging Tories with some 300 blogs, including Small Dead Animals and Stephen Taylor. More recently, Liberal and NDP bloggers, many of whom are Progressive Bloggers, have joined to create Liblogs and New Democrats Online. The environmental Green Bloggers have about 90 Canadian Bloggers. There is also a group of non-partisan Canadian bloggers, committed to no particular party, called The Blogging Alliance of Non-Partisan Canadians. There are also a number of regional blog groups, although most are non-political.

MP Garth Turner's blog is one of two active blogs by Canadian MPs. He was suspended from the Conservative caucus amid allegations of breaching caucus confidentiality on his blog. MP David L. Anderson also has a blog focusing on Western Canadian agricultural issues.

== Blogs and authority ==
In March 2005, full-time Canadian tech blogger Jeremy Wright was detained and strip-searched by U.S. Immigration while crossing into the U.S. because he told officials his occupation was "blogger."

== See also ==
- Group Blogs
