= 511 Building =

511 Building may refer to:

- 511 Building (Minneapolis), a colocation center located in downtown Minneapolis, Minnesota
- 511 Building (Portland, Oregon)
- 511 Federal Building, former federal post office that currently houses Department of Homeland Security offices for U.S. Citizenship and Immigration Services and U.S. Immigration and Customs Enforcement in Portland, Oregon
