= Toronto Internet Exchange =

Not-for-profit Internet Exchange Point

- Full name: Toronto Internet Exchange Community
- Abbreviation: TorIX
- Founded: 1998
- Location: Canada, Toronto, Ontario
- Website: www.torix.ca
- Ports: 333
- Peers: 259
- Peak in: 1344 Gb/s
- Peak out: 1344 Gb/s

The Toronto Internet Exchange Community (TorIX) is a not-for-profit Internet Exchange Point (IXP) located in a carrier hotel at 151 Front Street West, Equinix's TR2 data centre at 45 Parliament Street and 905 King Street West in Toronto, Ontario, Canada. As of March 2021, TorIX has 259 unique autonomous systems representing 285 peer connections and peak traffic rates of 1.344 Tbps, making it the largest IXP in Canada. According to Wikipedia's List of Internet Exchange Points by Size, TorIX is the 16th largest IXP in the world in numbers of peers, and 17th in the world in traffic averages. The Exchange is organized and run by industry professionals in voluntary capacity.

Within 151 Front Street, TorIX is accessible within facilities operated by Equinix, Cologix, Neutral Data Centres and Frontier Networks, or available via the building's meet-me-room (MMR), which makes the IX reachable by any organization with a presence in the building. At Equinix TR2, TorIX is available to all organizations present there. At 905 King Street West, TorIX is accessible via the building meet-me-room.

== History ==
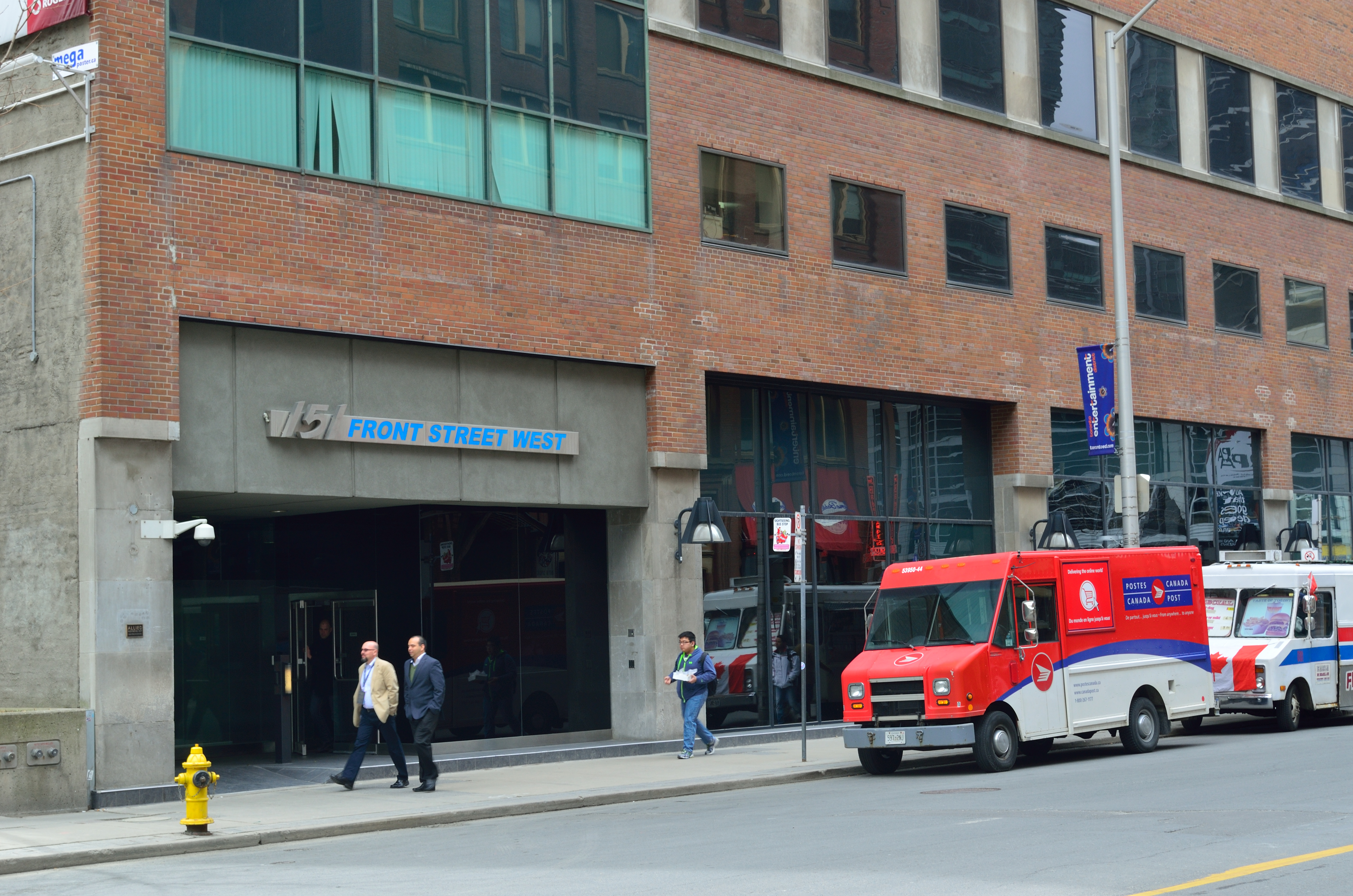
151 Front Street West Building

TorIX initially started by Bill Campbell and Jason Lixfeld in 1997 the RACO facility in suite 604 at 151 Front Street West. In 2003, the exchange began offering gigabit Ethernet. The Exchange began offering 10 Gigabit Ethernet ports in 2008 and 100 Gigabit Ethernet ports in 2015.

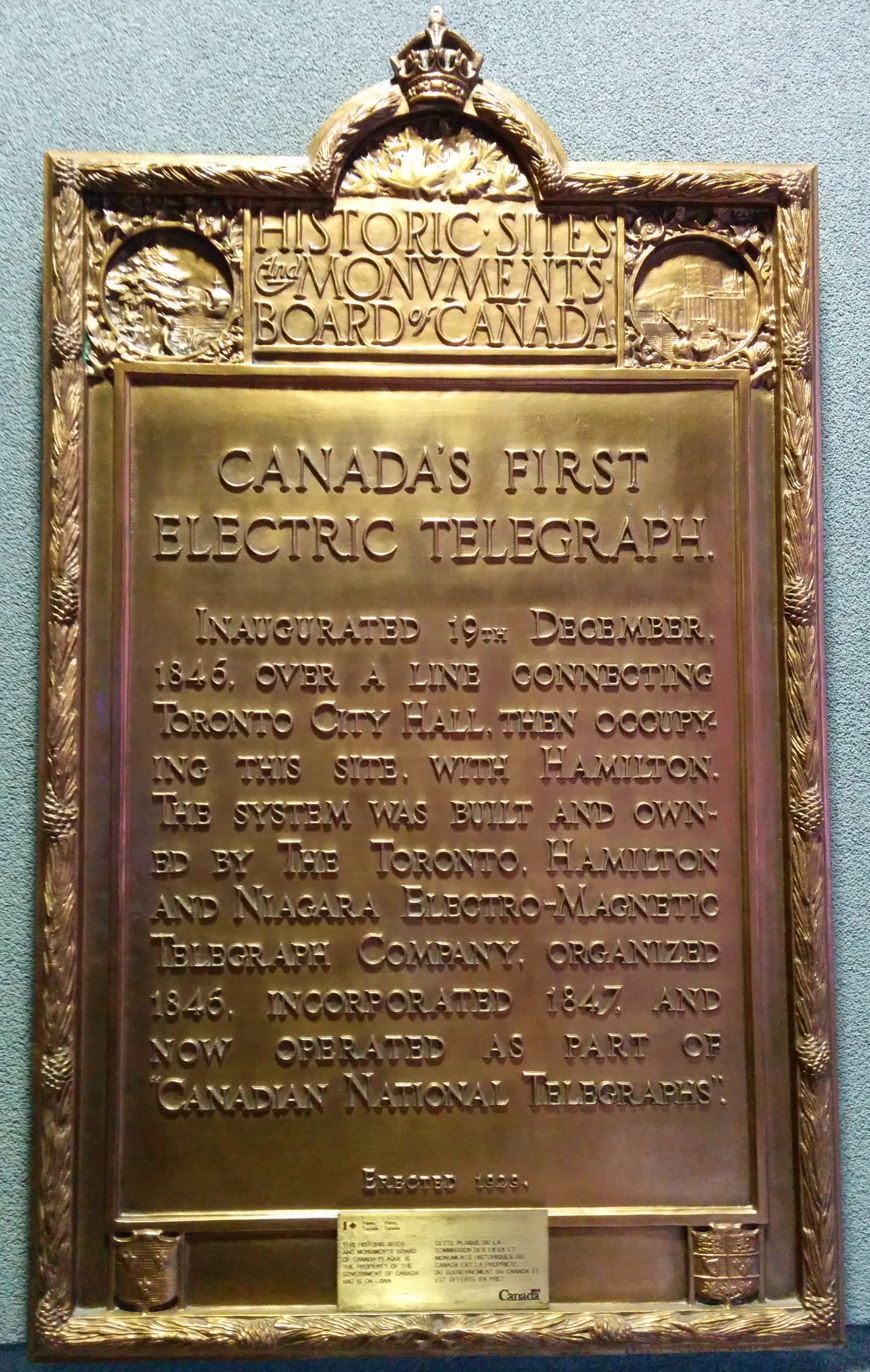
Inaugurated 19 December 1846, over a line connecting Toronto City Hall, then occupying this site, with Hamilton. The system was built and owned by the Toronto, Hamilton and Niagara Electro-Magnetic Telegraph Company. Organized in 1846, Incorporated 1847, and now operated as part of "Canadian National Telegraphs". (Erected 1929)

== Architecture ==
The exchange is Ethernet-based and currently operates Cisco Nexus 9000 series switches. Core nodes handle port speeds of Gigabit Ethernet, 10 Gigabit Ethernet and 100 Gigabit Ethernet, including bonded configurations. Peers connect to the Layer 2 fabric using IPv4 & IPv6 addresses provided by TorIX to communicate with each other using the BGP routing protocol. Single-mode fibre is the only physical connection media supported.

=== Route-Servers ===
The Exchange also offers two BGP Route-Servers, which allow peers to exchange prefixes with each other while minimizing the number of direct BGP peering sessions configured on their routers. Participation is voluntary, with approximately 85 percent of the membership using the free service. Strict prefix filtering to prevent unintentional announcements of IP address blocks to other participants. The exchange allows participants the option of eliminating the TorIX ASN from the AS path of prefixes received via the route-servers. This can substantially increase the utility of the route-servers for participants, but should only be undertaken after careful consideration. In addition, TorIX participants will have a range of BGP communities that can be used for traffic engineering purposes.

=== Portal ===
The Exchange operates a members-only portal that allows peers to publish their peering policies, contact other members with peering requests, configure route-server access and options, track traffic usage, etc.

=== Community Projects ===
TorIX will consider hosting Internet community projects that are of an interest to members of the Exchange or the wider Canadian Internet.

==== ntp.torix.ca ====
Since 2012, TorIX has been hosting a cluster of Network Time Protocol (NTP) servers for use by the Internet as a whole. Using servers which sync to both GPS and CDMA sources, the TorIX NTP cluster is a stratum 1 time source. The original equipment was donated by the Canadian Internet Registration Authority (CIRA) and has since been replaced and upgraded. As of June 2019, it provides time to over 500,000 devices worldwide every minute.

== Membership ==
Membership is open to all companies capable of connecting to the exchange at 151 Front Street West or Equinix TR2, and have their own Autonomous System Number (ASN). The typical peer is an Internet service provider (ISP), communications company or a content delivery network, though overall membership includes a broad range of enterprise companies, government, and educational institutions. Peers have autonomous control over their routing policies at the exchange, and may peer with as few or as many as desired. The exchange does encourage use of the route-servers.

Members are not required to have their own provider-independent address space, but it is recommended. For those that do not, and who wish to join the exchange, companies are asked to provide a Letter of Authority from their ISP permitting them to advertise their IPv4 or IPv6 prefixes. Peers must have their own unique ASNs.

Organizations wishing to connect to TorIX can arrange colocation for their equipment with one of the many companies operating at 151 Front Street West or with Equinix at TR2, or use long-haul Ethernet transport through a third-party provider capable of physically connecting to the exchange.

Justification for joining the Toronto Internet Exchange is typical to most IXPs: financial, network performance and/or security.

High-profile members of TorIX include Google, Akamai, Facebook, Amazon, Yahoo!, Telus, Zayo Group, CANARIE, CBC, CenturyLink, CloudFlare, Cogeco, DigitalOcean, Distributel, Dropbox, Eastlink, Fastly, iTeraTEL, Limelight Networks, LinkedIn, Microsoft, ORION, OVH, Primus Canada, Rogers Communications, Shaw Communications, StackPath, TekSavvy, Twitch, Cogent Communications, Frontier Networks, Freedom Mobile and Vianet Inc.

=== Financial ===
Compared to commercial Internet transit pricing in Canada, the per-megabit cost of being a typical TorIX peer works out to cents-on-the-dollar, versus tens of dollars per megabit. According to Job Snijders' IXP Pricing List, TorIX is one of the lowest cost IXP's in the entire world.

Most commercial Internet transit agreements require a minimum traffic commitment level, which the customer must pay regardless if their usage is below that point. If usage exceeds the contracted commitment level, the customer usually pays based on an agreed per-megabit charge. Billing is typically done based on the 95th percentile. As a not-for-profit, TorIX charges a small port fee based on the speed of the port the member desires, rather than the amount of traffic traveling over TorIX. The more traffic, the better, but peers are not penalized for lower traffic levels.

The low-cost barrier to entry for prospective peers is attractive for smaller companies, while larger companies can see significant operational expense savings by utilizing the exchange at a fraction of the cost of commercial Internet transit.

=== Performance ===
By utilizing the exchange, members can keep their Internet traffic "local," without the added latency of a third-party Internet transit provider. For example, Internet traffic between two points in the same province that used different last mile ISPs may travel extensive physical distances, including to and from other countries, which would negatively impact latency-sensitive applications. Through direct peering relationships, members and their customers realize better network performance.

While many companies see a benefit in such arrangements, including many of the country's largest ISPs, Bell Canada is not a participant at TorIX.

=== Security ===
By keeping Canadian Internet traffic local within the country, many organizations are able to alleviate concerns regarding Canadian source/destination Internet traffic, particularly involving concerns regarding the American NSA's interception of cross-border traffic, best demonstrated by the revelations of Edward Snowden to the press.

=== Fees ===
Peers are charged an annual port access fee, with the cost dependent on the type of port and the number of ports required. These fees are used to offset the costs of running the exchange, including vendor support contracts, spare optics and hardware upgrades.

== Mailing lists ==
TorIX operates several mailing lists: three are TorIX specific, two deal with operational issues, and the other is a general member participation list. The exchange also hosts a mailing list for wholesale ISPs that connect to Bell Canada (formerly Bell Nexxia)'s wholesale DSL services, and this is a key source for up-to-date information on day-to-day issues experienced by operators.

== Sponsorship ==
TorIX has been a gold sponsor of the annual Canadian ISP Summit in Toronto since 2011.

TorIX sponsored NANOG 65 Montreal in October 2015.

In April 2010, TorIX was a co-sponsor of ARIN's conference in Toronto.

In February 2007, TorIX was a co-sponsor of NANOG's conference in Toronto.

== See also ==
- List of Internet exchange points
- Internet in Canada
