= Canadian online media =

Canadian online media is content aimed at a Canadian audience through the medium of the Internet. Presently, online media can be accessed by computers, smart-phones, gaming consoles, Smart TVs, MP3 players, and tablets. The characteristics of Canadian online media are strongly shaped by the Canadian communications industry, even though their statistics and findings are more often than not associated with American research. Large media companies are increasingly on the move to start up online platforms for news and television content. The exponential growth of Canadians' dependency on online content for entertainment and information has been evident in the recent decades. However, it has proven slow for Canadian online media to catch up with the constant increase of American online media. Regardless of medium, entertainment and information hubs are not solely focusing on satisfying the audience they have, but are also heavily expanding their reach to new global audiences.

== Types of online media ==
=== News and magazines ===
As information is increasingly going digital, the Newspaper Audience Databank (NADbank) claims online readership for most Canadian newspapers have surpassed the numbers in print readership. However, there is also lack of evidence that newspapers are coming to an end in Canada. For some of Canada's larger newspapers, readership has increased in both print and online formats. After The Globe and Mail's redesign, they claim to have fueled a 10.2% increase in both their print and online readers. Highlights from a 2010 study conducted by NADbank revealed the national newspaper readership remains high. Though the migration from print to online newspapers is still ongoing, print editions are still the most popular amongst Canadians.

Many news writers are beginning to have an active Twitter presence to communicate with their audiences. Large newspapers are urging writers to have a public persona on blogs or Twitter. Instant connection is becoming more substantial, as journalists are encouraged to interact with the public. Canadians are also becoming active participants in the journalistic process as journalists are realizing citizens' ability to perform fragments of journalism, such as taking on-the-scene pictures, tweeting, commenting online or simply editing a Wikipedia entry. Alfred Hermida of the University of British Columbia asserts that participatory journalism reinforces the public sphere, while news specialization ironically undermines it.

==== Online-only news ====
Openfile.ca was an online-only newspaper that concentrated on community-powered news, with the intent of connecting people with reporters to cover specific communities. Launched in May 2010, OpenFile aimed to promote citizen journalism by enabling anyone to suggest a story to cover, and then a paid journalist would conduct research and produce a polished piece. Stories were also geotagged to improve accessibility to citizens who wanted stories in their immediate neighbourhoods. By 2012, the site saw about 400,000 unique visitors per month, but it was suddenly shuttered in September of that year due to reported financial problems. As of 2014, the Openfile website simply states, "on hiatus".

Though news and magazine companies are increasing their presence online, publications such as Dose magazine have discontinued their print editions, but have gone on to develop their news website as it strategically targets a younger demographic.

Rabble.ca, another online-only news site, is a non-profit organization that publishes a mixture of original content and those of alternative publications. In 2008, they created rabbletv in an effort to branch out their multi-media presence. Rabble also hosts Babble, a forum pertaining mostly to political discussions, and most recently the Activist Toolkit, a wiki project that aims to enable members of the rabble community to engage in collaborative writing of content.

The Canoe Network is an online-only news site in Canada with a network of French and English news content, as well as sub-divisions of a job-listing site, TV programs, e-commerce and others.

FlipNews CA is a digital news platform that offer its users the ability to access the latest news in a summarized format. FlipNews CA distinguishes itself from traditional news outlets by delivering the news stories in three bullet points.

For right wing Canadians their Rebel News, founded by a former staff from the Sun News Networks; True North, founded as a charity version of a news network.

=== Television ===
In the digital age, large media conglomerates are taking the opportunity to broaden their audiences by pushing to start up their own online platforms for multimedia content. Rogers, one of Canada's largest communication companies, made the move in 2009 to create its version of Hulu.com, a popular on-demand streaming video service from the US. The concept was to provide free television programs in pursuance of promoting online content in Canada. It has also been noted as a way to secure Canada's future in broadcasting, as major cable companies were already losing customers to service cancellations in the United States. Much of the efforts to promote Canadian online content have proven to be difficult as the federal broadcast regulators are still in uncharted territories.

Many satellite companies in Canada also own TV stations. In September 2011, the Canadian Radio-television and Telecommunications Commission (CRTC) decided against the hoarding of specific televised programs by such companies for fair competition. Bell Canada has made such offerings with NFL games on Bell's Mobile TV package, as well as select NHL and CFL games on TSN.ca. Many communications companies compete to provide instant entertainment content.

Launched in June 2011, Shaw Communications have received legal complaints that their online video-streaming consists of movies from major film studios, some of which aren't licensed to be broadcast through their video-streaming platform. The objective was to work towards a development that would adjust to the shifting viewer trends.

=== Entertainment and gaming consoles ===
Microsoft Corporation plans to launch its on-demand and live TV service for the Xbox 360 gaming console in the winter of 2011. The Canadian service would include MLSE, UFC, Vevo, Rogers on Demand, Telus OPtik, YouTube, Facebook, Twitter, MSN Canada and the involvement of other companies.

Rogers Communications have started targeting specific Toronto Blue Jays fans by supplying them with the major league team's live games online, regardless if they have cable or not.

=== Online content on other media platforms ===
In November 2011, Amazon released the Kindle Fire, originally it was not available in Canada although since 2013 it has been available in Canada with limited streaming services.

For four days in October, the Canadian company Research in Motion's BlackBerry Internet Service experienced a service outage.

Research has also revealed more than 50% of Canadians are banking and shopping online. The demographics for these statistics no longer side with the younger generation, as older people are finding instant online transactions convenient.

=== Social media ===
American online content is popular in Canada. In the spring of 2011, the Canadian federal election was reported as the "Twitter election" by news media, as the result of the wide usage of online social media for citizen discussions and for candidates' exposure. It was not possible to prevent the transmission of poll results to a district (in a different time zone) whose polls had yet to close. This objective is nearly impossible with the vast amount of instant blogging and sharing of information on the election. Hashtags along the lines of #tweettheresults were being used by tweeters. Citizens discussed and deliberated that certain laws had to be changed to adjust to present day conditions.

Elections Act: Section 329

No person shall transmit the result or purported result of the vote in an electoral district to the public in another electoral district before the close of all of the polling stations in that other electoral district.

The 73-year-old law became the subject of debate with the advent of instant social media. Meant to prevent influencing citizens of the West coast whose time zone is about four and a half hours behind the East coast, bloggers had the possibility of receiving a fine of $25,000 for prematurely releasing the election results before all polls close. Under the Canada Elections Act, Section 329 applies to all forms of transmission regardless of the medium. In earlier days the Act was only directed towards television and radio outlets. Though a large amount of violation was anticipated in the 2011 Federal Election, only one case was prosecuted with a minimal fine. While some Tweeters and bloggers believe this is a violation of their freedom of expression, Elections Canada noted that results could be sent between individuals without breaching Section 329, though it was illegal to broadcast them on social media such as a Facebook Wall. Information technology specialists from Sequentia Environics and the Social Media Group have stated that people would not be able to conform to the policy conscientiously, and that enforcing confidentiality with the likes of Facebook and Twitter is nearly impossible. Other professionals have even stated there is no use of a law that cannot be enforced effectively. The multiple links and components to all growing social media platforms would necessite detailed examination of acceptable and prohibited sharing of election data.

A recent study conducted by the Print Measurement Bureau (PMB) on Canadians' social media usage patterns showed that one-third of Canadian social networkers are under the age of 25. Compared with the rest of the nation, social networkers are also twice as likely to visit online magazines, newspapers, television and radio.

Social media use in agricultural and rural development sectors in Canada is rapidly growing in recent years. Facebook and Twitter are the most used social media tools by the stakeholders of agriculture and rural development. Although there are a number of research and development initiatives of social and collaborative media the interest about social media in agriculture has just grown recently. Some of the few researches done on this topic indicates that social media use is mainly realized as a linear communication flows among stakeholders of Canadian agriculture. Therefore, it is necessary to move beyond and include strategies and capacity building initiatives for dialogical and social interaction approach to support innovative practices of stakeholders in this sector.

=== Interactive media and advertisements ===
In 2015 the Canadian Government official recognized the advertisement company, AdGear. Later as a consequence of increased online audience, the Canadian online ad revenue rose to $2.2 billion in 2010. Advertisers are now aiming to measure the attention of online users via clickthrough rate. The Interactive Advertising Bureau of Canada reported that the online ad revenue surpassed newspapers ad revenues dramatically. Newspapers have always made revenue from advertisements, and not subscriptions, and in recent years, this has not changed. Online newspapers are keen on increasing their readership to be more valuable to advertising.

== Ethnic online media ==
In Canada, immigrant minorities' access to ethnic media online serves as a source of news from their home countries.

Multicultural marketing is growing in Canada, with advertisers hoping to reach the country's hundreds of ethnic communities. In 2009, a study by Solutions Research Group revealed that the Internet has become the preferred medium amongst Chinese Canadians and South Asian Canadians, two of the country's largest cultural groups. Community portals in particular are popular amongst Canada's ethnic groups. Web portal 51.ca is an example of a common online networking site for the Chinese community. In Canada, advertisers place geo-targeted ads in foreign and online newspapers like TimesOfIndia.com to reach local audiences. Though there is abundant web activity amongst the minority population, they remain loyal to traditional media that communicate in their native languages.

== Canadian laws on online media ==
The Canadian Radio and Television Commission (CRTC) had recently deliberated on revising broadcasting rights from the many incoming internet-based broadcasters from other countries. Video streaming sites such as Hulu are not available to Canadians because Canadian broadcasters have rights to programming, and controls on how they are broadcast.

The request to conduct a formal review on TV content on the internet was turned down. Companies like Netflix Inc. were criticized for posing a threat to the domestic broadcasting system, and accused of having a competitive advantage. Since the prolonged consultation revealed there is no evidence that these internet-based movie services are negatively affecting the Canadian broadcasting system, companies like Netflix aren't compelled to follow the same rules and regulations, and don't have to fund Canadian broadcasting content or face the same regulations as cable and satellite distributors.

== Immediacy of communication and advanced connectivity ==
In the summer of 2011, a study by Angus Reid revealed that approximately one-half of online Canadians surveyed would give up cable service before they would give up the Internet. It is considered standard for digital home owners to spend over $100 per month for faster internet plans.

Fibre to the home replaces the traditional copper telephone wires with optical fiber cable, enabling it to surpass cable limitations. Well established in Asia, the infrastructure is being implemented in various parts of the United States but remains unrecognized to Canadians. In Ontario, Bell Canada has strategically started selling internet packages called Fibre 6,12,16, and 25, despite not being a FTTH service.

As usage of data and bandwidth is increasing due to the growing availability of high definition videos online, CRTC recently created a pricing model for ISP providers to follow. The model, which acts as a usage cap, allows for internet wholesalers to charge based on download speed and not by the volume of data, the latter proposed by Bell and declined by CRTC.

Arctic communities in Canada have poor communication infrastructures. Due to the residents' geographical isolation, proper access to web content can act as their window to domestic affairs and global matters.

== Specialization ==
Canadian telecommunications and media companies are also taking the opportunity to provide specialized content online as a means to cater to and attract specific audiences. Rogers Communications recently started making Toronto Maple Leafs hockey games accessible on the web for their cable subscribers as a television on demand service. The media company acquired the Toronto Blue Jays baseball team in 2000, anticipating an increase in on-demand viewership.

== Criticism ==
In 2011 Arianna Huffington of The Huffington Post asserted that Canadians need to put more effort into producing online media content and not perceive it as a taboo. She claimed that news scoops that are posted immediately online have more effect than those being held for the front page the next day.

== Future trends ==
As viewership steadily overtakes readership, a survey conducted by Rogers has revealed that Canadians' lives are continually becoming richer online and the sharing of photos are growing exponentially more popular. For the youth in Canada, digital media is the only media they have grown to know, and the Internet is the primary source of information and entertainment they have grown accustomed to. The research of journalism professor Alfred Hermida at the University of British Columbia shows a total of 17 million Facebook users in Canada. With social media, individuals tailor the news that comes to them as a means of efficiency, and share specific news to their immediate online community.

== See also ==
- Demographics of the Canadian political blogosphere
- Media of Canada
- Internet in Canada
- Internet Marketing
