= Steve Anderson (activist) =

Canadian activist

Steve Anderson is a Vancouver-based Canadian open media advocate, writer, video producer, and social media consultant. He writes a monthly syndicated column called “Media Links”. Anderson was instrumental in starting a nationwide grassroots campaign to stop the Canadian Radio-television and Telecommunications Commission (CRTC) from allowing usage-based billing and ending flat-rate Internet access in Canada.

== National campaign ==
Anderson is the founder of OpenMedia.ca, a Canadian nonprofit organization working to advance and support an open and innovative communications system in Canada.

Anderson was instrumental in sparking a nationwide public campaign against a decision by the CRTC to allow Bell Canada to impose usage-based billing, which would effectively end Canada's flat-rate Internet access. His efforts reached the prime minister's office attracted international attention.

== Writer and commentator ==
Anderson is a regular commentator on media and telecommunications developments, appearing both in Vancouver and Canadian national media. Anderson has worked for The Real News, FreePress, The Center for Media and Democracy, and Free Speech TV. Anderson's writing has appeared in numerous local and national print and online publications such as The Tyee, the Toronto Star, Epoch Times, Adbusters, Rabble.ca, Common Ground, Vue Weekly and Social Policy Magazine. Steve is a contributing author to Censored 2008: The Top 25 Censored Stories, and Battleground: The Media.
