= OpenMedia =

Canadian digital rights advocacy group

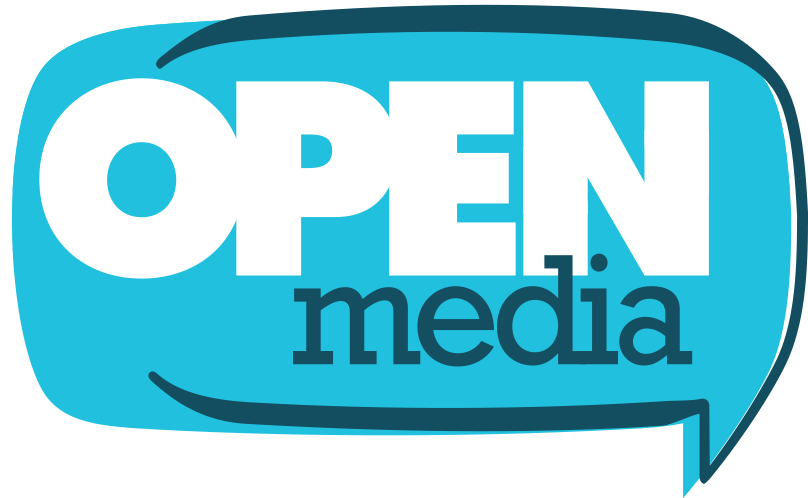
- Founded: 2008
- Founder: Steve Anderson
- Type: Advocacy organization
- Purpose: Digital rights; media access; civil Liberties; consumer advocacy
- Headquarters: Vancouver, British Columbia, Canada
- Location: Canada
- Executive director: Matt Hatfield
- Website: openmedia.org

OpenMedia is a Canadian non-partisan, non-profit advocacy organization working to encourage open and innovative communication systems within Canada. Its stated mission is "to advance and support a media communications system in Canada that adheres to the principles of access, choice, diversity, innovation and openness." The organization employs online campaigns, participatory events, school presentations and workshops. Its online petition for the "StopTheMeter.ca" campaign became the largest online appeal of its kind in Canadian history. In 2013, OpenMedia launched campaigns aimed at ensuring accountability in the Canadian government's surveillance activities.

== Activities ==
=== SaveOurNet.ca ===
OpenMedia was the primary organizer behind the SaveOurNet.ca coalition, whose aim is to protect openness, choice, and access for Canada's Internet.

=== StopTheMeter.ca ===
OpenMedia spearheaded the "StopTheMeter.ca" campaign against usage-based billing in Canada; including an online petition. The petition reached over 500,000 signatures and caused the Canadian Radio-television and Telecommunications Commission to reexamine its decision on the way Canadians are billed for their Internet access. It is the largest online appeal of its kind in Canadian history. The petition was supported by Canadian Internet service providers affected by the ruling (such as TekSavvy, which sent out invitations to sign to all of their customers), the Liberal Party of Canada, the New Democratic Party and Stephen Harper, who voiced his concerns over Twitter.

As of November 10, 2015, 514,741 Canadians had signed the http://stopthemeter.ca petition.

=== FreshMedia.me ===
OpenMedia are also the force behind the FreshMedia initiative, which celebrates innovative and independent media. FreshMedia.me aims to:

1. Ignite a national conversation to re-imagine media and journalism in Canada.
2. Celebrate the exciting and innovative experiments in independent and public media currently underway.
3. Develop a crowd-sourced plan to support innovative and quality media and independent journalism.

=== VoteNet.ca ===
VoteNet.ca was launched as a campaign to ensure that Internet access issues would become a focus for the 2011 Canadian federal election. Citizens were provided with a letter that they could modify and email to candidates in their riding asking them to become "pro-Internet". Politicians were then also able to register as pro-Internet candidates through the website. Multiple candidates have stated their support for the campaign.

== Current Campaigns ==
=== Protect Our Privacy ===
Protect Our Privacy is a campaign program organized by OpenMedia to help protect the privacy of the users of the Internet from government interference. This campaign supports the idea of transparency and privacy.

=== StopFastTrack.com ===
Stop Fast Track is a campaign to stop congress from fast tracking legislation for the Trans-Pacific Partnership, which they argue is being negotiated behind closed doors. Openmedia.org is one of over 100 organizations that has taken a stand against fast tracking legislation, each one created a statement that is under 140 characters so that people can easily tweet what the different organizations think about TPP.

=== AFairDeal.org ===
A Fair Deal is a multi-organization campaign to ensure that copyright laws do not change in the face of the Trans-Pacific Partnership. Openmedia.org argues that the current TPP agreement could restrict peoples access to the internet as well as how new media and information is created.

=== StopStingrays.org ===
Stop Stingray Surveillance is a multi-organization campaign to raise awareness towards the use of IMSI-catcher devices, often called Stingray, that are increasingly used by government agencies and law enforcement personnel. According to the campaign website, these devices can invade the personal conversations of anyone unknowingly without mandate. They demand oversight, accountability, and judicial safeguards to ensure right to privacy is respected.

=== StopWatching.us ===
OpenMedia is actively involved in bringing into the public's attention on National Security Agency's surveillance apparatus. They emphasize on the fact that NSA is abusing the rights of individuals. OpenMedia wrote a letter to the US congress informing their concerns of this surveillance apparatus.

=== ProtectInternetFreedom.net ===
This campaign's goal is to urge Internet users to join organizations by signing a petition in regards to Internet surveillance and censorship. OpenMedia claims that individuals should have their rights to embrace anything online.

=== EU Copyright Directive ===
OpenMedia has put forth a campaign sponsored by Google to spam policymakers in Europe against the adoption of EU Copyright Directive.

== Organizations involved with OpenMedia ==
OpenMedia has worked and coordinated action with a number of national and regional media-related organizations, as well as unions and civil liberty groups.

=== Media and Technology organizations ===
- Acanac
- Agentic
- Canadian Media Guild
- Fongo
- Megaphone Magazine
- National Campus-Community Radio Association (NCRA)
- The Edmonton Small Press Association (ESPA)
- The Tyee
- Pull Focus Film School
- Koumbit Networks

=== Public Interest Organizations ===
- BC Association for Media Education
- Canadian Association of Campus and Community Television User Groups and Stations (CACTUS)
- Canadian Internet Policy and Public Interest Clinic (CIPPIC)
- Council of Canadians
- Community Media Education Society (CMES)
- Media Action
- Hospital Employees' Union (HEU)
- National Union of Public and General Employees (NUPGE)
- Wilderness Committee
- World Association of Christian Communication (WACC) North America

=== Civil liberty organizations ===
- The Center For Information Awareness (CFIA)
- Civil Liberties Association, National Capital Region (CLA-NCR)
- Democracy Watch
- Public Interest Advocacy Centre (PIAC)
- The Ruth & Henry Goodman Fund for Social & Ecological Justice
- The British Columbia Civil Liberties Association (BCCLA)

== See also ==
- Electronic Frontier Foundation
