= Open Media (disambiguation) =

Open Media is a British television production company.

Open Media may also refer to:

- OpenMedia, a Canadian non-partisan, non-profit advocacy organization
- Open Media, a group including Open Russia, a political organisation in Russia founded by Mikhail Khodorkovsky
- Open Media Research Institute, archived by Blinken Open Society Archives

== See also ==
- Open Society Foundations, a grantmaking network founded by George Soros
