= Montreal Internet Exchange =

Internet exchange point in Canada

- Full name: Montreal Internet Exchange
- Abbreviation: QIX
- Founded: 1995
- Location: Montreal, Quebec, Canada
- Website: qix.ca
- Members: 100
- Ports: 122
- Peak in: 500 Gbps
- Peak out: 500 Gbps

The Montreal Internet Exchange (QIX) was incorporated in 2013 as a not-for-profit Internet Exchange Point (IXP) and is located in Montreal (Quebec), Canada. It was originally created in 1995 by the Réseau d'informations scientifiques du Québec (RISQ) and operated by RISQ until 2013, when it was spun off as the QIX. RISQ still operated the IXP until June 2019. that will allow each member connected to enjoy the benefits and advantages of the exchange. RISQ has been the operator of the EIM and ensured the management of the entire operation of the exchange, including membership and connection members, supervision and technical monitoring, service management portal members and billing until June 2019.

In 2013, QIX had two core switches, one located at the biggest carrier hotel in Montreal, Cologix MTL3, located at 1250 René-Lévesque West and one at Cologix MTL1, located at 625 René-Lévesque West.

Since the architecture/hardware refresh in 2020, the Cologix MTL3 site host two spine switches and two leaf switches. The Cologix MTL1 site is hosting one leaf switch.

The exchange announced in June 2020 that the IX has expanded to a new location close to the two current sites, eStruxture MTL-1, located at 800 Square-Victoria. This new site is hosting two leaf switches connected to Cologix MTL3 via two diverse dark fibre paths.

Another expansion site has been announced end of August 2020, at Vantage Data Centers QC4 (previously Hypertec YUL01B) and is in production since March 2021. This facility is located at 2800 Trans-Canada Highway in Pointe-Claire, QC in the Greater Montreal. This new site also host two leaf switches connected Cologix MTL3 via two diverse dark fibre paths.

As of October 2024, QIX has 108 unique autonomous systems representing 414 peer connections and peak traffic rates of over 320 Gbit/s, making it the second largest IXP in Canada.

In April 2023, QIX celebrated its 10 years of independence and was featured in Les Affaires.

As of mid 2023, QIX expanded in two new data centres, Cologix MTL7 and Equinix MT1 for a total of six point of presences on the island of Montreal.

In 2025, the Cologix MTL1 POP was shut down and many new features were implemented including a new IXP manager portal and BIRD Route Servers with RPKI ROV filtering.

== See also ==
- List of Internet exchange points
