= Uncapping =

Method to alter cable modem settings

Uncapping, in the context of cable modems, refers to a number of activities performed to alter an Internet service provider's modem settings. It is sometimes done for the sake of bandwidth (i.e. by buying a 512 kbit/s access modem and then altering it to 10 Mbit/s), pluggable interfaces (as by using more than one public ID), or any configurable options a DOCSIS modem can offer. However, uncapping may be considered an illegal activity, such as theft of service.

== Methods ==
There are several methods used to uncap a cable modem, by hardware, software, tricks, alterations, and modifications.

One of the most popular modifications is used on Motorola modems (such as the SB3100, SB4100, and SB4200 models); by spoofing the Internet service provider's TFTP server, the modem is made to accept a different configuration file than the one provided by the TFTP server. This configuration file tells the modem the download and upload caps it should enforce. An example of spoofing would be to edit the configuration file, which requires a DOCSIS editor, or replacing the configuration file with one obtained from a faster modem (e.g. through a Gnutella network).

An alternate method employs DHCPforce. By flooding a modem with faked DHCP packets (which contain configuration filename, TFTP, IP, etc.), one can convince the modem to accept any desired configuration file, even one from one's own server (provided the server is routed, of course).

Another more advanced method is to attach a TTL to the modem's RS-232 adapter, and get access to the modem's console directly to make it download new firmware, which can then be configured via a simple web interface. Examples include SIGMA, a firmware add-on that expands the current features of an underlying firmware, and others.

== See also ==
- Bandwidth cap
