= Blogging Tories =

Blogging Tories is a group of Canadian bloggers who come from the centre, centre-right, right-wing and libertarian sides of the political spectrum. The Blogging Tories are composed of many individual blogs, whose content is aggregated on the main Blogging Tories website.

Founded by bloggers Stephen Taylor and Craig Smith, the Blogging Tories have grown to include approximately 300 blogs. They are a part of the larger Canadian political blogosphere, along with Progressive Bloggers, New Democrats Online and Liblogs.

== Extended role ==
The Blogging Tories website has extended well beyond its original role as a collection of Canadian conservative blogs. It currently serves as a central hub for national conservative NGOs including the Canadian Taxpayers Federation and the National Citizens Coalition. Blogging Tories founder Stephen Taylor addressed the inaugural meeting of the Manning Centre for Building Democracy on the floor of the Toronto Stock Exchange, speaking about blogs and the importance of the Blogging Tories to conservative politics in Canada. The Manning Centre is a new initiative to enable Canadian conservative groups that was started by former Leader of the Opposition, Preston Manning.

== Gomery ==
A member of the group acquired transcripts of testimony at the Gomery inquiry and leaked it to Ed Morrissey, an American blogger not affected by the publication ban. Blogging Tories members were encouraged to link to Morrissey's website, and by the following Friday Justice Gomery suggested that the "genie had been let out of the bottle" and lifted the publication ban.

Other notable events include the Abotech affair, the Grewal-Dosanji-Reid taping controversy and a defense of Stephen Harper from an attack against his leadership by Tory dissident Carol Jamieson.
