= CANARIE =

Research and education network in Canada

CANARIE Inc.
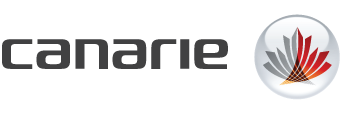
- Type: Not-for-profit
- Industry: Digital Research Infrastructure
- Headquarters: Ottawa, Ontario, Canada
- Key people: Mike Tremblay (President and CEO)
- Website: www.canarie.ca

CANARIE (formerly the Canadian Network for the Advancement of Research, Industry and Education) is the not-for-profit organisation which operates the national backbone network of Canada's national research and education network (NREN). The organisation receives the majority of its funding from the Government of Canada. It supports the development of research software tools, provides cloud resources for startups and small businesses, provides access and identity management services, and supports the development of policies, infrastructure, and tools for research data management.

== History ==
The Canadian Network for the Advancement of Research, Industry and Education was created in 1993. It initially focused on the development of the CANARIE network, which provides interprovincial and international connectivity for Canada's National Research and Education Network (NREN). Provincial and territorial partners in the NREN provide connectivity to institutions in their jurisdictions, and connect to CANARIE to collaborate and share data and tools across Canada and around the world. The NREN connects universities, colleges, research hospitals and government research labs. CANARIE links Canada's NREN to over 100 NRENs around the world. The CANARIE network was originally called CA*net or CAnet. The original CA*net was created in 1990 with support from the National Research Council. In 1993 that CANARIE had upgraded its links to 56 kbit, to 10 Mbit/s in 1995, and then later to 20 Mbit/s. It had 100 Mbit/s aggregate capacity in 1996, and the same year the National Test Network (NTN) project introduced ATM.

In 1997, Bell Advanced Communications Inc. (later Bell Nexxia, now part of Bell Canada) was given operating control over the network operations. The replacement network, CA*net II, was launched based on NTN links and capacities, with OC-3 (155 Mbit/s) at the core. At the same time, Sympatico "DSL" service started, using the same technology. In 1998, CANARIE deployed CA*net 3, the world's first national optical research and education network, with a planned capacity of 2.5 Gbit/s. In 2002, the Government of Canada committed $110 million to CANARIE to build and operate CA*net 4. CA*net 4 yielded a total network capacity of 40 Gbit/s, 16 times its predecessor. CA*net 4 was based on OC-192 optical circuits, with a capability of offering users optical Lightpath services, a legacy dedicated point-to-point connection between research facilities.

CANARIE has funded the development of research software tools since 2007. In 2011, it took on the operations and support for the Canadian Access Federation, which provides participants with secure access to eduroam, an international federation of campus WiFi networks. The Canadian Access Federation also provides the trust framework to enable participants to access remote web-based datasets and tools in a secure and privacy-protecting environment. In 2011, it also launched the Digital Accelerator for Innovation and Research (DAIR) program, which provides cloud computing resources for small businesses and entrepreneurs. Since 2014, it has provided financial support for Research Data Canada (RDC), an initiative focussed on developing the standards, policies, and infrastructure to support reuse and preservation of research data. In 2014, CANARIE became a partner in the Centre in Excellence in Next Generation Networks (CENGN), which supports the development and commercialization of next generation networking technologies. At the SuperComputing conference in Seattle, WA, in November 2011, CANARIE participated in the transfer of 1 petabyte of data between the California Institute of Technology and University of Victoria, at a combined rate of 186 Gbit/s, setting a world record.

== Status ==
In the year ending March 31, 2016, CANARIE transferred 172,000 Terabytes of data over the CANARIE network. Data traffic on the CANARIE network is growing at an average annual rate of ~50%.

As of 2016, institutions connected to the NREN include: 85 universities, 85 colleges, and 30 CEGEPS, 85 federal government research labs, 46 teaching and research hospitals, 10 business incubators/accelerators, almost 5,500 K-12 schools, 12 provincial and territorial Regional Advanced Networks (RANs), and 100+ National Research and Education Networks around the world.

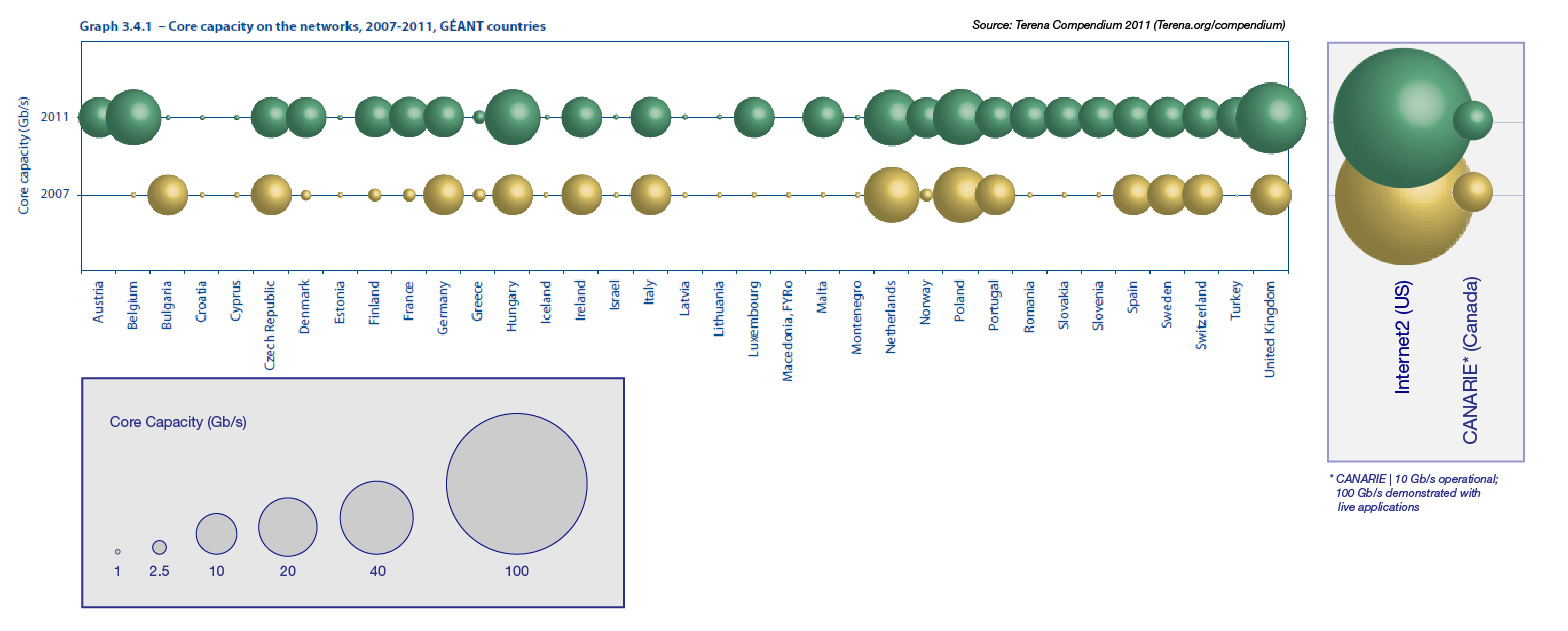
CANARIE's capacity as compared to other NRENs.

== Programs and services ==
=== CANARIE Network Program ===
Research and Education (R&E) Internet service is the largest program. The core network provides full and equal support for IPv4 and IPv6 unicast and multicast routing, with external network segments that extend to international R&E exchanges in North America: Pacific Wave in Seattle, StarLight in Chicago, and Manhattan Landing (MANLAN) in New York. With anticipated traffic growth in the coming years, in 2015, CANARIE upgraded most of the core links to 100 Gbit/s. The CANARIE Network Program offers two additional services to R&E institutions:

=== Content Delivery Service (CDS) ===
The Content Delivery Service provides Canadian R&E institutions with high-speed access to content providers like Amazon, Microsoft, Google, Yahoo, Facebook and Box.net. It has become an important service within CANARIE's Network Program.

=== NREN Connection Service ===
The CANARIE Connection Service is a dedicated connection for researchers who need a direct, secure, private link with peers, within Canada or globally. The service can provide researchers up to a 100 Gbit/s point-to-point Ethernet connection to high-performance computing centres or research facilities across Canada or around the world by being directly installed into their infrastructure. NREN Program CANARIE provides funding to provincial and territorial network partners through the NREN Program. This funding ensures that the national backbone and the provincial and territorial networks continue to support Canadian innovation and leadership by increasing capacity, reliability, and upgrades to existing equipment and infrastructure, enabling network management (tools and training), and extending the reach of the provincial and territorial networks to more institutions.

=== Identity and Access Management – Canadian Access Federation (CAF) ===
CAF is a trusted access management environment that provides users Wi-Fi connectivity and content access whether at home or abroad, all using the log-in credentials of their home institution. CANARIE supports guest access to campus WiFi networks through eduroam, an international WiFi roaming federation for education, and remote access to resources through a federated framework.

== Regional partners ==
CANARIE works with 12 provincial and territorial partner networks to provide ultra-high-speed connectivity across the country. These National Research and Education Network partners are referred to as RANs, Regional Advanced Networks, and include the following:

Yukon: Yukon University
Northwest Territories: Aurora College
Nunavut: Nunavut Arctic College
British Columbia: BCNET
Alberta: Cybera
Saskatchewan: Saskatchewan Research Network (SRnet)
Manitoba: MRnet
Ontario: Ontario Research and Innovation Optical Network (ORION)
Quebec: Réseau d'informations scientifiques du Québec (RISQ)
New Brunswick & Prince Edward Island: NB/PEI Educational Computer Network (University of New Brunswick and University of Prince Edward Island)
Nova Scotia: Atlantic Canada Organization of Research Networks – Nova Scotia (ACORN-NS)
Newfoundland and Labrador: Atlantic Canada Organization of Research Networks (ACORN-NL)

== Funding model ==
The Government of Canada is the primary funder of CANARIE, providing $176 million over five years starting in 2025–2026 as part of Budget 2024.

=== Funding history ===
- 2002–2007: $110M
- 2007–2012: $120M
- 2012–2015: $62M
- 2015–2020: $105M
- 2020–2025: $174M
- 2025–2030: $176M
