= AdGear =

Online advertising technology company

AdGear is an online advertising technology company and the first official advertising technology provider for the Government of Canada. The privately owned company was founded in 2008 by Yves Poiré, Vlad Stesin and Bosko Milekic in Montreal, Canada. It currently operates offices in Montreal under Samsung.

== History ==
In 2013 the company announced it would power ad delivery for LaPresse+, the tablet edition of Montreal-based newspaper La Presse. The French language's tablet app will replace the weekly print edition by the beginning of 2016.

AdGear also provides rich media ad serving for the tablet edition of the Toronto Star's tablet app Star Touch, which launched in September 2015. In September 2015, AdGear also became the first ever digital advertising technology provider for the Government of Canada.

== Products ==
AdGear offers a full-stack of real-time advertising products, such as a demand-side platform called AdGear Trader, a data management platform, an advertiser ad server and a publisher ad server.

== Acquisition ==
In June 2016 AdGear was acquired by Samsung Electronics.

== See also ==
- Rethink Communications
- Round Table Advertising
