= Réseau d'informations scientifiques du Québec =

- Company type: Not-for-profit cooperative
- Industry: Telecommunications network
- Headquarters: Montreal, Quebec, Canada
- Key people: Marc Denoncourt (CEO) Daniel Besner (CEO)
- Website: www.risq.quebec

The Réseau d'informations scientifiques du Québec (RISQ; lit. "Quebec Scientific Information Network") is the optical research and education network in the province of Quebec, Canada. The Risq is a non-profit cooperative established in 1989 by leaders from Quebec's universities, RISQ originally connected those universities to the U.S. government's NSFNET using leased telephone connections. It manages the education and research network in the Province of Quebec. This organisation offers telecommunication services to the Provincial universities and the Colleges of further education (CEGEP), the school boards, research institutes, university hospitals, government departments, agencies, cultural and service organizations.

RISQ has been a major component of the Internet in Quebec, and it also operates the QIX ™, the only neutral and public Internet exchange point in Quebec under the governance of the Montréal Internet Exchange.

The Government of Quebec provided RISQ with a $37 million grant in 2000 on the condition that the network expand to cover all post-secondary institutions in the province. RISQ now operates a high capacity broadband network throughout Quebec using over 6,000 kilometres (3,700 miles) of fibre-optic cable.

RISQ provides broadband Internet access to its over 150 member institutions which include universities, CEGEPs, teaching hospitals, government departments and agencies, non-profit organizations, and the Mont Mégantic Observatory. It serves approximately 750,000 users. With a very high capacity infrastructure at the forefront of the Internet, its broadband network covers approximately 7,000 kilometers across Quebec.

RISQ connects to research and education networks elsewhere in Canada and internationally through the national CANARIE network, which exchanges with RISQ at the Montreal Internet Exchange. It also maintains a direct connection to the Ontario Research and Innovation Optical Network via Ottawa.

== Background ==
Starting in the 1980s, Québec universities developed with acceleration more international collaborations and tried to attract researchers and students from elsewhere. Computer needs in the research sector gradually increased, particularly with respect to the exchange of data between researchers around the globe.

Arpanet (Advanced Research Projects Agency Network), which had been mandated by DARPA (Advanced Defense Research Projects Agency) to develop the first packet-based network in the United States, will eventually split into two separate networks: one for the military, the other one academic. In 1985, the National Science Foundation Network (NSFNet), an ambitious US sponsored program was born to create the very first Internet network, whose first links came into service in 1987. " The creation of this organization will be a major event for the academic world.

The new reality of the higher education and research community encouraged IT directors from Quebec's major universities to partner with the Montréal Computer Research Center (CRIM) to become part of this new network. RISQ will connect the first RISQ members to one another and then connect to the US Internet network (NSFnet): this initiative will mark the birth of the Internet in Quebec.

In 1989, collaboration between academia and CRIM led to the creation of the first independent network for teaching and research purposes, the Quebec Network of Scientific Interconnectors. RISQ was the first Internet service in Quebec. It has enabled the development of an information highway throughout the province and remains, even today, the heart of its evolution.

In 1993, thanks to the efforts of the education and research community, as well as the federal government through NRC and Industry Canada, each province's Internet networks came under the umbrella of the CA network * net. Gradually, all universities and research centers ask to be connected to the network through the RISQ.

Starting in 1994, the Québec government is interested in this new technology and is creating the Information Highway Fund. The network more than doubled in the prior year. The rapid growth led the network infrastructure to a saturation point that no longer met the requirements of users. In 1995, only organizations located in Montreal, Quebec and Sherbrooke enjoyed connectivity.

Applications to integrate the network from other regions of Quebec became more frequent. Carrying out a major restructuring of RISQ became imperative to deploy the network in all the cities served by a university. Furthermore, to promote the Internet in Quebec and allow the commercial market to develop, RISQ proposed to play a role of commercial incubator for the cities of Montreal, Quebec and Sherbrooke.

In 1995, RISQ obtained a first three-year grant from the Information Highway Fund. The grant will allow the organization to modernize its infrastructure, support new applications and accommodate new communities that do not have access to local connectivity services. The rapid growth of the Internet in Quebec, as was the case on the American territory, quickly posed coordination and information challenges.

To ensure a certain coherence in the development of the Internet, RISQ proposed to create a neutral venue or an information and coordination center, which will become the CIRISQ. Considered as a true source of information and popularization, the CIC targeted Quebec companies and members from different sectors of society: journalists, engineers, politicians, manufacturers, traders, students, etc.

Until 1995, RISQ helped the first Internet Service Providers to become commercial enterprises. Quickly, the Internet becomes accessible to individuals and businesses in the form of a commercial service separate from what was initially considered to be the academic Internet and the RISQ returns to its primary mission, supporting teaching, learning and research endeavours.

In June 1998, RISQ left the bosom of Montreal's Computer Research Center to become a full-fledged organization. The organization is incorporated and becomes the "Network of Scientific Information of Quebec", while retaining the acronym RISQ.

In 2000, RISQ obtained a major investment grant from the Quebec government to extend the network throughout most of the province of Quebec, wherever a campus of a university or Colleges of further education (CEGEP) was located.

Two years later, on September 18, 2002, the Quebec government officially launched its Villages branchés du Québec program (Connected towns) to encourage school boards to connect their schools in a network. At the same time, by subsidizing the connection links, the government encouraged school boards to connect to the RISQ and exchange with each other.

In 2009, the RISQ is 20 years old. A tribute is paid to its founders whose dream has allowed to build a very broadband private telecommunication network intended exclusively for teaching and research. In 20 years, digital Quebec has made a considerable progress and RISQ is proud to be one of its major contributors.

In 2010, RISQ connects a network of smart cities located in Quebec that have decided to regroup to better share their resources and reduce their operating costs. The grouping, which became the GVQ (Big cities of Quebec) in the spring of 2012, is today made up of eleven Quebec cities (Boucherville - Saint-Lambert - Brossard, Gatineau, Laval, Lévis, Longueuil, Montreal, Quebec, Saguenay, Sherbrooke, Terrebonne and Trois-Rivières). These cities represent more than 4.1 million citizens and 52% of the population of Quebec. This working group shares resources, shares expertise and collaborates on various projects. RISQ is proud to contribute to the success of this model of sharing resources and collaborative work.

Over the years, the RISQ network has grown. Today, it stretches across Quebec over a distance of about 7,000 km of optical fiber. With 150 connected institutions to date and more being added. Quebec universities, colleges, school boards, research centers, government institutions, hospitals and content providers now benefit from RISQ's services and expertise.

In 2014, RISQ celebrated its 25th anniversary by recalling its role in the history of the Internet in Quebec and revisiting its brand image. RISQ has played and continues to play a key role in Québec's digital economy.

== Mission ==
To promote exchanges and collaboration between educational and research institutions, from a regional, national and international point of view, RISQ has three main missions:

1. Develop, operate and maintain a telecommunications network to provide broadband Internet primarily for research, education and training.
2. Meet the needs of users of its telecommunications network for access and services, including access to the Internet.
3. Facilitate and encourage consultation and collaboration between its members in the development of infrastructure and applications of its telecommunications network for the purposes of training and research.

== Services ==
=== IntraRISQ Service ===
As the main service of RISQ, IntraRISQ is a real nervous system. It offers all the security and robustness needed to meet the most demanding needs of its members and partners to facilitate data transfer and provide a reliable infrastructure that easily supports real-time applications such as video conferencing, telepresence, voice over IP, etc.

IntraRISQ enables the exchange of IP traffic at unconventional performance levels across the network, thanks to very high capacity links and excessively short transmission times. Only the capacity of the access equipment is generally the limiting factor.

=== LanX (Local Area Network Extension) ===
This service provides the institution with a private network that connects several locations (campuses). The Information Technology Branch can apply its own security policies across all of its locations as if it were one. It also allows the use of multiple virtual networks (Vlan); he can thus segment his intercampus services according to his needs.

=== CANARIE ===
The CANARIE service provides access to Canada's advanced research and innovation network. It is a very high speed fiber optic network that connects provincial, national and international research networks. RISQ is the only gateway to the CANARIE network in Quebec.

=== Commercial Internet ===
To meet the needs of its members and partners, RISQ offers symmetrical broadband Internet access without a strangulation policy differentiated according to the type of traffic or limitation of the monthly volume transmitted, even during peak periods. This service offering is greatly enhanced by the many redundant and robust connections in the RISQ network. It consists solely of major international providers to ensure maximum performance for non-RISQ communications. By acting as a pooled purchasing cooperative, RISQ is able to offer advantageous rates to its users.

=== Content Service ===
Complementary to commercial Internet service, the Content service provides greater flexibility and lighten the use of bandwidth for commercial Internet service. It offers privileged access to several content providers of interest for training and research in Quebec. In addition, RISQ is the only telecommunications network in Quebec that distinguishes access to content providers from commercial Internet access.

=== Service R- Security ===
In terms of security, no service can guarantee complete protection, but it is possible to adapt innovative solutions in order to be as well protected as possible. This is exactly what RISQ offers you with the R-Security service.

This service is intended for users who wish to use a protection service against denial of service attacks. Such attacks can render a service or even an infrastructure unavailable by overloading network links or overloading its resources.

=== Redundancy Service ===
This service perfectly meets the needs of members whose campus connection requires high availability. The RISQ provides a local loop physical link redundancy service associated with a second access router connected to a separate distribution point.

The Redundancy service ensures a reliable and robust connection to RISQ services as well as the maximum availability of services.

=== Contingency Service ===
RISQ offers its members the opportunity to use the services of a second Internet service provider, which would be used for polling when the primary link with the RISQ network is not available. For the establishment of this service, RISQ acts as prime contractor. In collaboration with the member, they agree on the choice of the secondary supplier and RISQ enters into the contract with this supplier, which acts as subcontractor of the RISQ. The goal is to achieve a robust architecture, with a standardized configuration, to facilitate support and reduce costs.

=== RISQ-Cloud ===
The RISQ-Cloud service is intended for members who want to outsource services or infrastructures by using cloud providers.

The objective is to provide connectivity between the RISQ network and the provider network that allows the use of outsourced services through data transfer under conditions that are likely to improve the performance, security, reliability and confidentiality. Connectivity is provided by IntraRISQ by a very wide bandwidth that allows the use of applications in real time.

=== RISQ Firewall ===
The goal of RISQ Firewall is to enable RISQ members to benefit from advanced security features, analysis, security reporting and redundant firewall infrastructure equipment. This pooling is based on the sharing of management roles and responsibilities between the member and the RISQ. The RISQ is responsible for the common infrastructure while the member is responsible for managing the security rules specific to its institution.
