= 511 Building (Portland, Oregon) =

Building in Portland, Oregon, U.S.

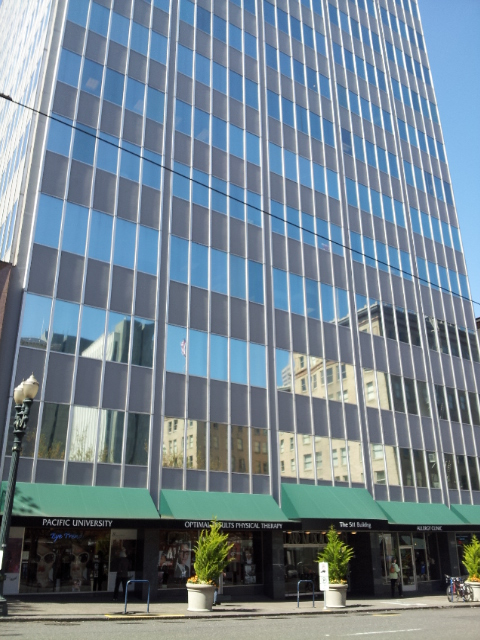
- The building's exterior in 2013
- Interactive map of the 511 Building area

General information
- Location: Portland, Oregon, United States
- Coordinates: 45.52121652055204°N 122.68183187874263°W

The 511 Building is a building in southwest Portland, Oregon. The 14-floor structure was completed in 1956.
