= Data cap =

Restriction imposed on the transfer of data

A data cap, often referred to as a bandwidth cap, is a restriction imposed on data transfer over a network. In particular, it refers to policies imposed by an internet service provider to limit customers' usage of their services; typically, exceeding a data cap would require the subscriber to pay additional fees. Implementation of a data cap is sometimes termed a fair access policy, fair usage policy, or usage-based billing by ISPs.

American ISPs have asserted that data caps are required to provide a "fair" service to their respective subscribers. The use of data caps has been criticized for becoming increasingly unnecessary, as decreasing infrastructure costs have made it cheaper for ISPs to increase the capacity of their networks to keep up with the demands of their users, rather than place arbitrary limits on usage. It has also been asserted that data caps are meant to help protect pay television providers that may also be owned by an ISP from competition with over-the-top streaming services.

== Example caps ==
In 2016, Consumer Reports concluded that a 1TB data cap is unlikely to be exceeded when the bulk of one's data usage is 4K video. In their example, watching all four seasons of House of Cards in 4K quality would consume slightly over half of a 1TB data cap.

When the internet connection is also used for video games or online back-ups, a 1TB cap can be exceeded more easily. In a 2019 article on Vice, the author shared their experience of draining 14% of their monthly 1TB data cap in two days by downloading Destiny 2 and Tom Clancy's Ghost Recon Breakpoint from Steam. The author also notes that automatically downloaded patches and updates for modern games can contribute significantly to exceeding a data cap.

== Unlimited data ==
"Unlimited data" is sometimes a marketing promotion in which an Internet service provider offers access to Internet without cutting service at the data cap. However, after a user passes some data cap, the provider will begin bandwidth throttling to decrease the user's data access speed, slowing down the user's internet use.

== By region ==
As of October 2015, there were 58 wired broadband providers in the US that used data caps, among them major wireless cell phone providers such as Verizon Wireless and AT&T.

Before 2010 there was a trend of providing unlimited data without bandwidth throttling. In the United States the Federal Communications Commission has fined service providers for offering unlimited data in a way that misled consumers. In June 2015, the FCC fined AT&T Mobility US$100,000,000 for misleading consumers. In October 2016 the FCC reached a settlement with T-Mobile in which they would pay US$48,000,000 for failing to disclose restrictions on their unlimited data plans.

Iranian Communications Regulatory Authority set a Fair Usage Policy in 2017.

== Justification ==
American internet service providers have asserted that data caps are needed to provide "fair", tiered services at different price points based on speed and usage.

In 2016, Sonic.net CEO Dane Jasper criticized the historical assertions that data caps are meant to conserve network capacity, arguing that the cost of actually delivering service had "declined much faster than the increase in data traffic". When Sonic was first established in 2008, its infrastructure costs were equivalent to 20% of its revenue, but these had fallen to only 1.5% by 2016 because of the declining equipment costs. Suddenlink CEO Jerry Kent made a similar assertion in an investors' call, stating that the "days" of having to make investments to keep up with customer demand were "over", and there would be "significant free cash flow generated from the cable operators as our capital expenditures continue to come down."

As most major U.S. internet providers own television providers, it has also been suggested that data caps are intended to discourage users from dropping their pay television subscriptions by placing de facto restrictions on the use of competing streaming video services that are delivered over the internet, such as Netflix. The lobbying group Internet Association additionally argued that data caps are meant to create "artificial scarcity", especially in markets where there is limited competition in broadband, also pointing out that some providers offer their own streaming video services that are exempted from data cap policies, such as Comcast's Stream TV. Comcast defended the exemption by stating that the service is not delivered over the public internet; it can only be used while connected to the provider's home Wi-Fi router.

== See also ==
- Bandwidth (computing)
- Bandwidth management
- Internet in Canada § Usage-based billing
- Uncapping
