= Progressive Bloggers =

Progressive Bloggers is the name of an affiliated group of Canadian bloggers who come from the centre, centre-left and left-wing of the political spectrum. Progressive Bloggers primarily maintain their own blogs, whose content is then aggregated on the main Progressive Bloggers website.

Progressive Bloggers was created in May, 2005 by Wayne Chu from the Canadian political website freethought.ca.

== Political approach ==
The central political belief of the Progressive Bloggers is that Canadian society should move in a progressive direction. The values that they promote include the importance of the environment, the preservation of Canada's social programs and of Canada's multicultural mosaic. Members often blog in support of these issues. Feminism has been identified as a peripheral issue to Progressive Bloggers.

== Qualification for membership ==
As of the end of 2018, Progressive bloggers includes over 250 members. Membership is open to any Canadian-themed progressive blog anywhere in the world. It is not affiliated with any political parties and attracts people with differing views, including some members of the Conservative Blogging Tories.

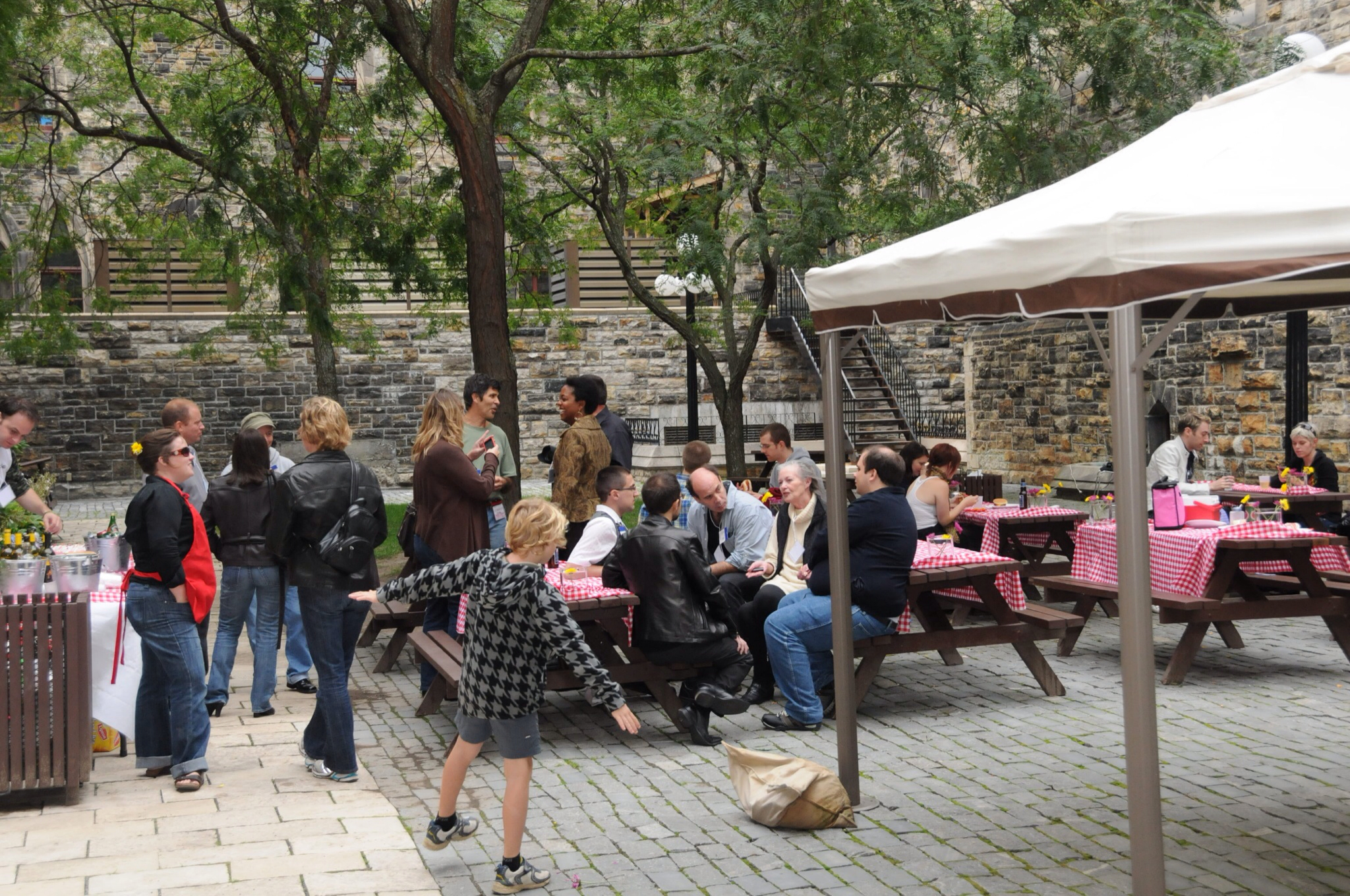
A Saturday afternoon barbecue for Progressive Bloggers, East Block, Parliament Hill, Ottawa Canada (2010)

Those wishing to join Progressive Bloggers submit an application. Members review all applicant blogs to ensure that they fit with the political mission statement of Progressive Bloggers. Membership can be rejected or revoked if a blogger acts in bad faith, such as berating readers of their blog, or falsifying their comments.

Unlike some prominent sites like Daily Kos, which all self-identified progressives can join, the members of Progressive Bloggers on occasion vote to deny membership to certain applicants. This has predictably led a few members to express suspicions about whether this practice serves to favour a particular political orientation, or approach to politics. For example, some feminist bloggers have questioned the practice of rejecting blogs that emphasize personal over formal politics, although this appears to have been based upon a misunderstanding: "the personal is the political" blogs are accepted, but personal blogs—my garden, my cat—are not.

While one or two active members have called for a change in membership criteria, these calls have been of too general a nature to be systematically addressed by the moderators. In fact, most of those who apply are accepted, based upon very loose criteria indeed (the blogroll is an explicitly political one, with a Canadian focus; new bloggers may have to wait for a period to establish that they have staying power). The diversity of Progressive Bloggers' political affiliations itself shows that there is no narrow ideological screening on the part of the moderators.

== Canadian blogosphere context ==
Political Weblogs have a high visibility in Canada. Former Prime Minister Paul Martin kept a high-profile blog during his campaign for leadership of the Liberal Party. As an opposition member, former Minister of Citizenship and Immigration Monte Solberg kept a widely read blog. Warren Kinsella, a former advisor to Prime Minister Jean Chrétien, maintains a high profile blog as well. Comedian Rick Mercer also keeps a blog that frequently pokes fun at Canadian politicians. The contents of political blogs have been used to both defend and attack politicians in Parliament.

In the early 2000s, the Canadian blogosphere began to organize itself into groups based on political philosophy (left vs. right), political party (Liberal, Green, New Democratic Party, Conservative) and geographic location. Membership in several groups is common, and there is considerable overlap between membership in the Progressive Bloggers and other blogging groups, especially geographic ones.

There is a friendly rivalry between the Progressive Bloggers and the other large groups of Canadian bloggers, especially the Blogging Tories. Blogging Tories who consider themselves Red Tories share many views in common with the Progressive Bloggers and some have memberships in both groups. Soon after the creation of Progressive Bloggers, a list of Liberal bloggers known as Liblogs was formed.

Monitoring the Progressive Bloggers website can give a quick snapshot of what political developments and world issues are considered important in the Canadian blogosphere, as well as what the range of opinion is on these issues. Journalist Antonia Zerbisias uses Progressive Bloggers to tell Toronto Star readers what political happenings have engaged Canadians' attention (e.g., 1, 2).

== History ==
Progressive Bloggers was created in May, 2005 by Wayne Chu with the help of Dan Arnold. In 2006 Scott Tribe took over as head admin.

A group of Progressive Bloggers were accredited to cover the Liberal Party's 2014 Biennial Convention

== Website technology ==
Progressive Bloggers uses custom designed software for its site. It aggregates member posts as they are uploaded to their own blogs and creates a tag cloud from the posts. The website once allowed users to vote on which Progressive Blogger posts were currently the best but this feature was removed in 2015.

== See also ==
- New Democrats Online.
- Liblogs
