= Liblogs =

Canadian bloggers group

Liblogs was a group of Canadian bloggers. The Liblogs membership consists of bloggers who generally support the Liberal Party of Canada. Content from member blogs is aggregated on the main Liblogs website.

== See also ==
- LiberalsONLINE
- Progressive Bloggers
- New Democrats Online
