= Minnesota Technology Center =

Buildings and structures in Minneapolis

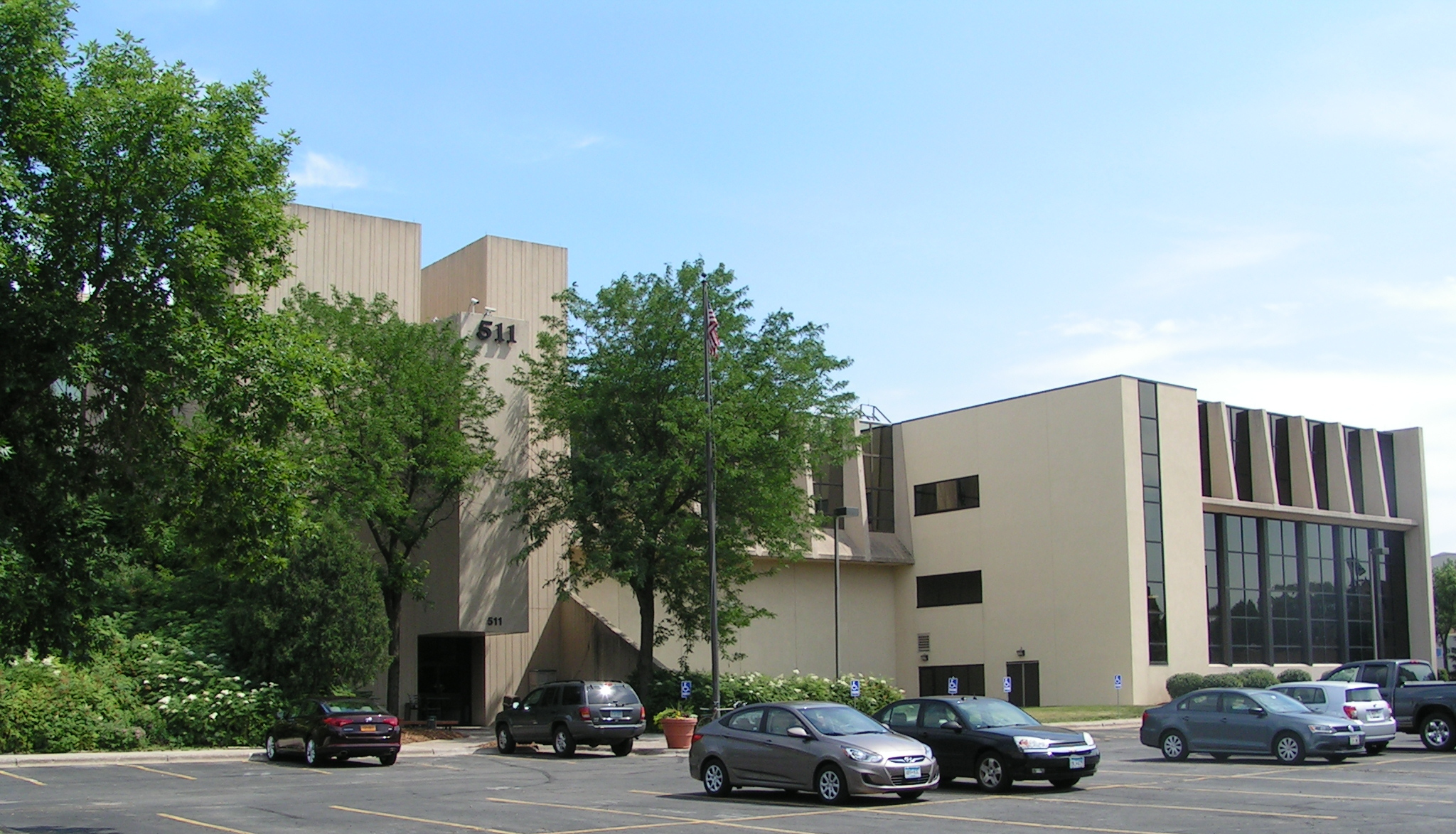
- Interactive map of the Minnesota Technology Center area

General information
- Location: Minneapolis, Minnesota, 511 11th Avenue South
- Coordinates: 44°58′18.3″N 93°15′17″W
- Inaugurated: 1982
- Renovated: 2003
- Landlord: TimeShare Systems, Inc.

Technical details
- Floor count: 3
- Floor area: 273,000 sq ft

Renovating team
- Civil engineer: Palanisami & Associates, Inc.

The Minnesota Technology Center, formerly called the BTC/Bunker and also known as the 511 Building in reference to its address, is a colocation center located in downtown Minneapolis, Minnesota, near U.S. Bank Stadium and the West Bank campus of the University of Minnesota. The 511 Building has been referred to as "the most wired building in Minnesota" and is a major source of fiber optic data transmission and reception. It is operated by Timeshare Systems Inc. It hosts an interchange between many major carriers, and is on the Internet Backbone.

The City of Minneapolis budgeted almost $750,000 to rent space at the center for a security command center during the 2018 Super Bowl and 2019 Final Four. The Midwest Internet Cooperative Exchange is an Internet exchange point operating within the 511 building, connecting over 100 internet service providers.
