= TekSavvy =

Canadian residential, business, and wholesale telecommunications company

TekSavvy Solutions Inc.
- Type: Private
- Industry: Telecommunications
- Founded: January 1998
- Headquarters: Chatham, Ontario, Canada
- Key people: Marc Gaudrault (CEO)
- Products: Wireless broadband, DSL, Cable Internet, Landline, VoIP
- ASNs: 5645, 20375
- Website: www.teksavvy.com

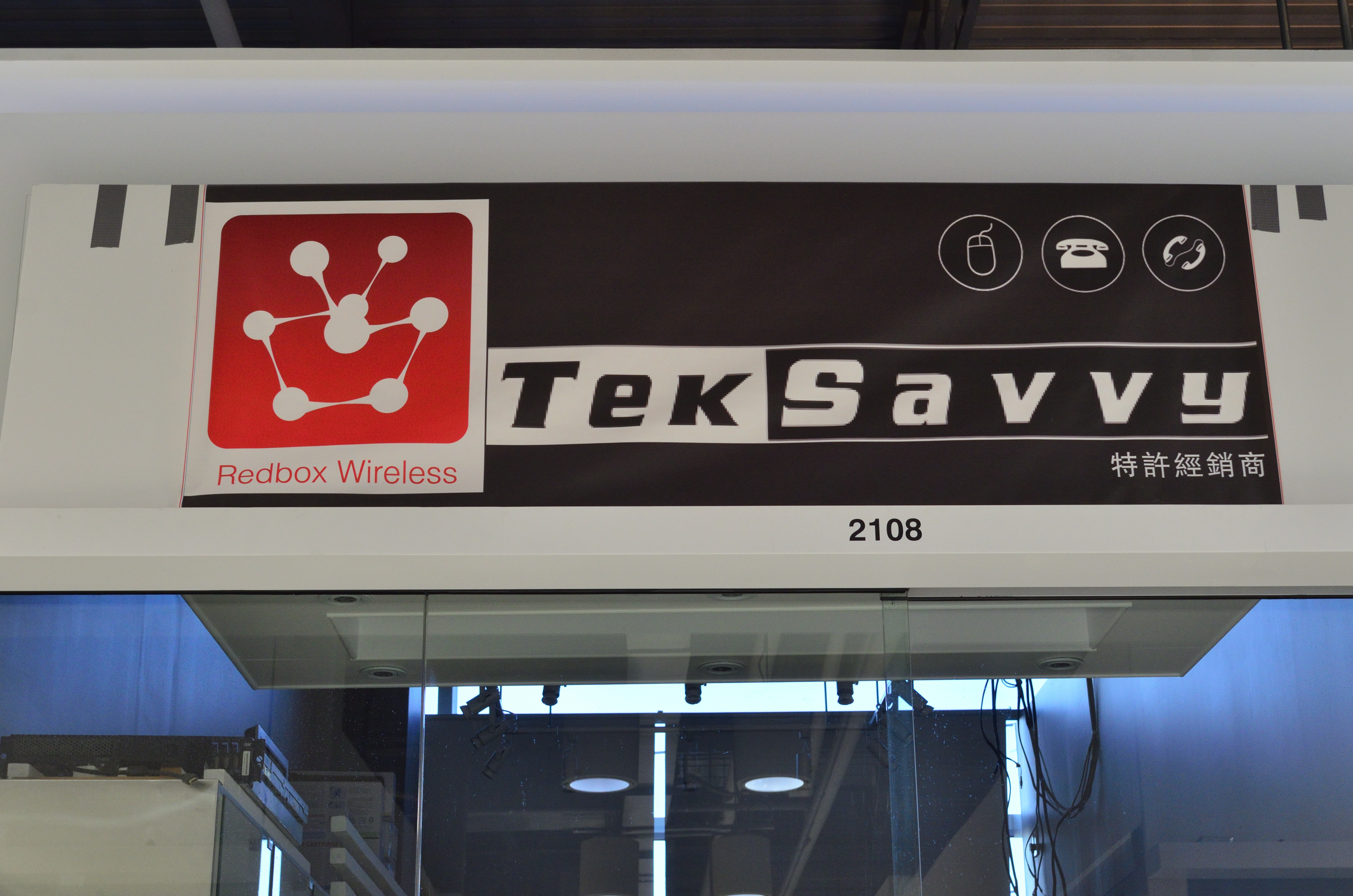
TekSavvy reseller

TekSavvy Solutions Inc. (TSI) is a Canadian residential, business, and wholesale telecommunications company based in Chatham, Ontario. In most of the country, it is a wholesale-network-access-based service provider and voice reseller, connecting its service to existing last mile networks from telecom carriers Bell Canada (including Bell Aliant) and Telus Communications, and cable carriers Rogers Communications, Cogeco Cable, Shaw, Vidéotron, and Eastlink. However, in parts of rural southwestern Ontario, the service is provided over TekSavvy's own fixed wireless network (branded as "Sky Fi"). Recently they have also rolled out their own fibre optic network in parts of southwestern Ontario.

== History ==
TekSavvy Solutions Inc. was founded in January 1998. The company ranked 27th in 2008, 33rd in 2009, 44th in 2010, and 33rd 2011 on the list of fastest-growing companies in Canada on Canadian Business Magazine's Profit 100 list. By 2011, it had been rated as the number one ISP in Canada by the users of DSLreports.com for five years. In 2012, it was 12th on the Branham 300 Top 20 Movers & Shakers list.

== Services ==
While TekSavvy operates primarily by connecting its service to network access ("last mile" infrastructure) from Bell, Rogers, Cogeco, Shaw, Telus, Vidéotron, and Eastlink, the service differs in terms of pricing and features according to the network access platform to which it is connected.

Broadband Business Internet, Fibre Dedicated Access, VOIP Telephony and Web hosting services are available in most service areas.

=== Wireless broadband ===
TekSavvy offers fixed wireless broadband (branded as "Sky Fi") in rural areas of Chatham-Kent and the counties of Lambton and Essex in Ontario using unlicensed spectrum.

=== Digital subscriber line (DSL) ===
TekSavvy offers digital subscriber line (DSL) service using Bell lines in Ontario and Quebec, Telus lines in Alberta and British Columbia, and Bell Aliant lines in New Brunswick, Newfoundland, Nova Scotia and Prince Edward Island.

Before the summer of 2011, TekSavvy could only access Bell's "Performance" speed tier, with maximum speeds of 5 Mbit/s. Starting in July 2011, several months after the Canadian government allowed third-party ISPs to access higher speed tiers, TekSavvy started offering the same DSL speed tiers found at Bell. High-end plans with 10+ Mbit/s upload speeds require an approved VDSL2 modem, while all lower DSL tiers can be used with any compatible ADSL2+ modem. In 2014 TekSavvy replaced the rental with rent-to-own and one-time purchase options of a SmartRG 505N modem.

On March 20, 2013, TekSavvy added a 50 Mbit/s tier, the fastest FTTN tier that Bell started offering a month earlier. TekSavvy offers the same FTTN DSL speeds available from Bell. The only exceptions are that for the slowest plans, 6 Mbit/s regular DSL and 7 Mbit/s FTTN DSL is sold by TekSavvy instead of Bell's 5 Mbit/s plans. All DSL plans now offer a choice between 150 GB, 400 GB or unlimited Internet access with overage charges of $0.25 per GB (with a cap of $25).

=== Cable Internet ===
TekSavvy's cable Internet offerings rely on Rogers, Shaw, Videotron or Cogeco infrastructure to connect customers to TekSavvy Internet. In areas served by Rogers, TekSavvy cable Internet is offered with either 15, 30 or 100 Mbit/s download speeds with the choice of 150 GB, 400 GB or unlimited downloads. In areas served by Cogeco, most predominantly in the Niagara region, there are 5 packages available at speeds of 6, 10, 20, 30 or 60 Mbit/s with a standard bandwidth cap of 150 GB/month, excluding the 6 Mbit/s service, and a 300 GB or unlimited option for a fee. The same 300 GB and unlimited options are available in Chatham-Kent, Ontario and major cities in the British Columbia Lower Mainland, with lower speeds due to the Cogeco and Shaw infrastructure used in those regions. In Quebec, Vidéotron provides the cable infrastructure. In some areas, they are offering Cable at speeds of 120, 200, and 940 Mbit/s as of 2018.

=== Telephone ===
TekSavvy also provides a long-distance calling service using VoIP. The home phone service (branded as "TekTalk") is available in British Columbia, Ontario, and Quebec.

=== Television ===
TekSavvy TV is a residential over-the-top television service available to select TekSavvy Internet customers. The service, offered by affiliate company Hastings Cable Vision, launched on February 1, 2019, in Ottawa, Ontario. Later expansions brought the service to more regions in Ottawa and Quebec.

The service consists of a low cost digital basic package, with over 45 channels from over 20 networks, including must-carry channels and several provincial channels. Additional channels may be purchased with pick packs, consisting of 10 to 40 channels from a catalogue of 93 channels, or with theme packs, such as movies and sports. TekSavvy also offers video-on-demand content and TV Everywhere service from selected TV channels.

== Opposition to usage-based billing ==
TekSavvy has been very public about its stance against usage-based billing (UBB). Former CEO Rocky Gaudrault argued, in 2011, that the larger bandwidth allotments of wholesale operators is one of those operators' more distinguishable factors, stating, "The answer to future growth is not to stifle it by imposing punitive pricing but to encourage it, accommodate it, and make more money on greater volume consumed at lower prices with more efficient infrastructure." TekSavvy devotes most of its news page to addressing its concerns about UBB.

== Policy on disclosure of subscriber personal information ==
TekSavvy has a policy to "not provide personal information to a 3rd party when copyright infringement is alleged unless ordered to do so by a court... [and] do its best to ensure that its customers receive notice when disclosure of their personal information is sought in such cases."

=== Voltage Pictures v. Does ===
In November 2012, Voltage Pictures, an American film production company with a history of filing lawsuits against people alleged to have illegally shared movies online, sought disclosure of personal information belonging to approximately 2000 TekSavvy subscribers based on data collected by the Canadian anti-piracy company Canipre between September 1, 2012, to October 31, 2012.

On November 14, 2012, Voltage filed a Statement of Claim in Federal Court, initiating action against TekSavvy (court file T-2058-12, Voltage Pictures LLC v. John Doe and Jane Doe) seeking a court order for the release of subscribers' personal information, including telephone numbers and email addresses, associated with about 2000 IP addresses allegedly involved in copyright infringement.

On February 21, 2014, the Federal Court released its decision compelling TekSavvy to identify the consumers identified by Voltage as alleged downloaders while also implementing several constraints on Voltage. The court ruled that the demand letters sent by Voltage to the specified consumers be approved by a judge to ensure "there is no inappropriate language" and that "any correspondence... shall clearly state in bold type that no court has yet made a determination that such subscriber has infringed or is liable in any way for payment of damages", and that Voltage must pay TekSavvy's legal costs and any costs associated with identifying the consumers. The Federal Court ruling further limited the information Voltage could request from TekSavvy, only permitting them to access the names and mailing addresses of the subscribers in question.

TekSavvy stated in a February 21, 2014 press release that they were satisfied with the framework implemented by the Federal Court for the case, claiming that it will protect consumers by discouraging future copyright trolling, but will only provide the information when Voltage meets all conditions of the courts orders and the affected customers have been notified. Yet, some scholars have contended that the framework implemented by the Federal Court in this case fails to adequately protect the affected customers' online privacy rights in accordance with the principles articulated by the Supreme Court of Canada in R v. Spencer.

== See also ==
- Net neutrality
