= Saskatchewan Research Network =

- Company type: Not-for-profit
- Industry: Networking Systems
- Founded: 1996
- Headquarters: Saskatoon, Saskatchewan, Canada
- Key people: Chad Coller - President
- Number of employees: 8 (2023)
- Website: www.srnet.ca

Saskatchewan Research Network Incorporated (SRNET) is a research and education network providing networking service support education, research and innovation in the province of Saskatchewan, Canada. SRNET is member-driven and is a not-for-profit member of Canada's National Research and Education Network, which provides dedicated high speed network access to institutions and companies across Canada. SRNet also provides members access to CANARIE, a dedicated network that links similar research networks. The network also interconnects high performance computing resources within the province. SRNET's members link in to 112 international advanced networks in over 80 countries. Membership is open to all research, education and innovation organizations and institutions in Saskatchewan.

Their primary office is located in Regina, Saskatchewan, in the IT Building at Innovation Place research park.

== History ==
Originally established in the early 1980s as a network to connect the University of Saskatchewan and University of Regina library systems together; it later expanded to be part of NetNorth with interconnects with BETNet in the United States and EARN in Europe. In 1989 the organization evolved into the operator of Sask*net, providing Internet based access to research organizations in the Province.

In 2006, SRnet expanded beyond its original base in Saskatoon and Regina to also include Prince Albert and Moose Jaw, Saskatchewan.

In the past SRnet operated networking research laboratories in Saskatoon and Regina.

== Members ==
SRNET has 11 members in Saskatchewan:

Federal Members

- National Research Council Canada – Plant Biotechnology Institute – Saskatoon
- Natural Resources Canada – Prince Albert Satellite Station
- Agriculture and Agri Food Canada – Saskatoon Research Centre
- Canadian Space Agency – Saskatoon

Provincial Members

- Greater Saskatoon Catholic Schools
- Saskatchewan Opportunities Corporation Innovation Place and Prince Albert Forestry Centre
- Saskatchewan Polytechnic including: Saskatoon Campus, Moose Jaw Campus, Regina Campus, Prince Albert Campus
- Saskatchewan Research Council – 51st Lab – Saskatoon
- University of Regina
- University of Saskatchewan
- CNET Learning VPN
