= ORION (research and education network) =

Canadian research and education network

Ontario Research and Innovation Optical Network
- Formerly: Optical Regional Advanced Network of Ontario (ORANO)
- Company type: Not-for-profit
- Industry: Telecommunications network
- Headquarters: Toronto, Ontario, Canada
- Key people: Alfonso Licata (President and CEO)
- ASN: 26677
- Website: www.orion.on.ca

The Ontario Research and Innovation Optical Network (ORION) is a high-speed optical research and education network in Ontario, Canada. It connects virtually all of Ontario's research and education institutions including every university, most colleges, several teaching hospitals, public research facilities and several school boards to one another and to the global grid of R&E networks using optical fibre.

== History ==
ORION was founded in 2001 (then as The Optical Regional Advanced Network of Ontario, or ORANO) with the support of the Ontario Government. ORION is a self-sustaining not-for-profit organization kickstarted by the Ontario Government under Premier Mike Harris.

ORION is owned and operated by a not-for-profit corporation governed by a board of directors, which includes representatives from the fields of education, research and business. ORION was initially funded by the Government of Ontario with additional funding from CANARIE, as well as private and public sector organizations and institutions. ORION is a self-sustaining organization, generating revenue from its connected institutions through user access fees and over network-based services.

In April 2023, GTAnet merged with ORION.

== Network ==
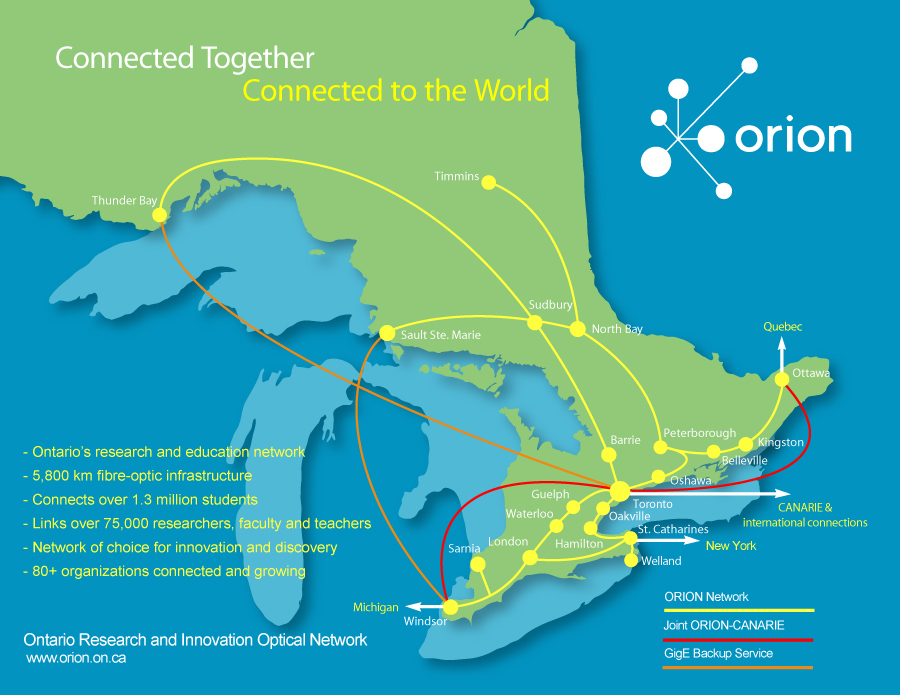
Ontario's ORION Network - August 2009

The network spans 6,000 kilometres (3,700 miles) and connects 28 communities throughout Ontario. Almost 100 organizations and special projects connect to ORION directly, including 21 universities, 22 colleges, 34 school boards representing 2 million students, 13 teaching hospitals and medical research centres, and other research and educational and public library facilities.

ORION connects to research and education networks elsewhere in Canada and internationally through the national CANARIE network, which exchanges with ORION at the Toronto Internet Exchange.

== Events ==
=== THINK Conference ===
ORION hosts the annual THINK Conference and bestows the annual ORION Leadership Awards, to recognize individuals and groups who have led and championed the use of advanced and collaborative technologies to support research, education, innovation and discovery here at home in Ontario or on the global stage.
