= ACORN-NS =

ACORN-NS logo

The Atlantic Canada Organization of Research Networks - Nova Scotia (ACORN-NS) operates an advanced research and education network in Nova Scotia, Canada.

ACORN-NS is the partner for Nova Scotia and runs the Nova Scotia GigaPOP (Gigabit point of presence) on Canada's National Research and Education Network (NREN). The NREN is an essential collective of people, tools, services and digital infrastructure that provides a collaborative environment to advance Canadian leadership in research, education and innovation. and its twelve provincial and territorial partners form Canada's NREN. The NREN connects Canada's researchers, educators and innovators to each other and to data, technology, and colleagues around the world.

The Members of ACORN-NS are the province of Nova Scotia's 11 post secondary colleges and universities; and the affiliates of ACORN-NS which include some provincial and federal government departments and organizations, as well as smaller community and regional networks.

The Objectives of ACORN-NS

1. to refine, implement and maintain a resilient, secure, advanced research and education network architecture
2. to reliably operate Nova Scotia's advanced research and education network including the CANARIE GigaPoP
3. to promote the value and innovation created by the advanced research and education network
4. to maintain a sustainable model for ACORN-NS
