= List of cable television companies =

This is a list of cable television providers by country.

== Africa ==
=== Egypt ===
- Cable Network Egypt
- WATCH IT

=== Nigeria ===
- CONSAT TV
- DaarSat
- Multichoice
  - DStv
  - GOtv
- MyTV
- StarTimes

==== Defunct ====
- HiTV

=== South Africa ===
- Multichoice
  - DStv
  - GoTV
  - Showmax
- StarSat
- Openview HD

=== Tanzania ===
- Azam TV
- Tabora Television Broadcasting Co, Ltd, Tabora Region, Tanzania
- Digital System

== Americas ==
=== Argentina ===
- Flow
- DirecTV
- Supercanal
- Telecentro
- Gigared
- Telered

=== Barbados ===
- Cable & Wireless Communications (LIME) - A division of Liberty Latin America

=== Bolivia ===
- COTAS TV Digital
- Movistar TV
- Supercanal
- Inter Satelital

=== Brazil ===
- Claro TV
- NET
- Oi TV
- SKY Brasil
- Vivo TV
- Nossa TV
- Algar Telecom

=== Canada ===
- Access Communications - Saskatchewan
- Bell Canada - Quebec and Ontario
- Cable Axion - Quebec
- Cablevision - Quebec
- Cogeco Cable - Southern/Eastern Ontario and Central Quebec
- DERYtelecom - Quebec
- EastLink - Atlantic Canada and Greater Sudbury, Ontario
  - Coast Cable - British Columbia
  - Delta Cable - British Columbia; now part of Eastlink
  - Northern Cablevision - Alberta
- Northwestel - Northern Alberta, Northern British Columbia, Yukon, Northwest Territories, and Nunavut
- Novus Entertainment - Metro Vancouver
- Rogers Cable - Greater Toronto Area, Ontario; London, Ontario; Ottawa, Ontario; New Brunswick; Newfoundland and Labrador | - Western Canada, Northern Ontario
- SaskTel - Saskatchewan
  - Shaw Direct
- Tbaytel - Northern Ontario
- Telus - British Columbia and Alberta
- Vidéotron - Quebec and parts of Ontario
- Westman - Brandon, Manitoba and surrounding areas
- VMedia - Ontario, Quebec, Manitoba, Saskatchewan, Alberta and British Columbia
- TotalTV - Quebec and Ontario
- Execulink Telecom - Ontario
- Comwave - Ontario
- Atop TV
- Teksavvy - Ontario

Defunct

- Access - Nova Scotia
- Cablecasting
- Cablenet
- CF
- Classicomm
- Compton Communications
- Fundy Cable
- Garnet Cable
- Killaloe Cable
- MacLean-Hunter Cablesystems
- Moffat Broadcasting
- Northern
- Rush
- Selkirk
- Trillium Cable
- VIC Communications
- Videon

=== Chile ===
- Telefónica del Sur
- Entel
- Tigo TV
- Movistar
- Claro TV
- CMET
- GTD Manquehue
- Mundo Pacífico
- TV RED
- VTR

=== Mexico ===
- Dish México
- Izzi Telecom
- Megacable
- SKY México
- Totalplay
- StarTV
- Telecable (México)

=== Panama ===
- Liberty Latin America
- Cable Onda

=== Paraguay ===
- Consorcio Multipunto Multicanal
- Saturn Cable Televisión

=== Trinidad and Tobago ===
- Amplia (Massy Communications)
- Bmobile (TSTT)
- Columbus Communications (Flow Trinidad)
- Digicel Play
- Green Dot
- Air Link Communications

=== Uruguay ===
- MutiTel

== Asia ==
=== Azerbaijan ===
- KATV1

=== Bangladesh ===
- Bengal Digital
- BumbellBee
- Jadoo Digital

=== China ===
==== Hong Kong ====
- CableTV
- HKBN
- PCCW
- SuperSUN
- Now TV

=== India ===
- Kfon
- Digiana Projects Private Limited
- RCCNetwork Cable & Broadband Services, Nagpur
- A.Ptv Network
- AD Group Cable Network
- Advanced Multisystem Broadband Communication Pvt. Ltd
- Arasu Cable
- Arkays Digital Media Cable
- Asianet Satellite Communications Limited
- Atria Convergence Technologies
- Barasat Cable TV Network Pvt. Ltd
- CableComm Services Pvt. Ltd
- ChandparaCable TV Network Ltd
- Channel 3
- Darsh Digital Cable Network
- Darshan Pooja Cable TV Network
- DEN Networks
- Dew Shree Network
- Digi Maharaja Cable Network
- DIGICON
- DL GTPL Cabnet Pvt. Ltd
- Dolly Cable Network
- DWL - Digital Space Link
- Fastway Transmissions Pvt. Ltd.
- Gujarat Telelink P Limited (GTPL)
- Hathway
- Home Cable Network Pvt Limited
- ICE TV Pvt
- IndusInd Media & Communication Ltd (IMCL)
- Intermedia Cable Communication Pvt. Ltd. (ICC)
- JAK Communications
- JPR Channel
- Kailash Cable Network P Ltd
- Kal Cables Pvt. Ltd.
- Kerala Communicators Cable Ltd
- Kolkata Cable & Broadband Pariseva Ltd
- Link Entertainment (Howrah Cable)
- Live Satellite
- Manthan Digital/Manthan Broadband Services Pvt Ltd
- Marine BizTV
- Mohit Cable Vision
- NXT Digital (Hinduja-HITS network)
- Ortel Communications
- Prem Channels Pvt Ltd
- Ravi Cable Network
- Radiant Digitek Network Limited
- Ramtek City Cable Network
- Reliance Digicom (ex Digicable)
- RVR Infra
- Sanjay Cable Network Pvt Ltd
- Satellite Vision Cable TV & Broadband Services
- Satellite Vision Pvt Limited
- SCV
- Seven Star Dot Com Pvt Ltd
- Silver Line Broadband Services P Ltd
- Siti Cable (Siti Network Limited)
- Siti Vision Digital Media
- Spectra Net Ltd
- Star Broadband Services (India) P Ltd
- STV Network
- TACTV
- UCN Cable Network Pvt. Ltd
- Universal Communication System
- U-Digital Network Pvt Ltd.
- Kee DIGITAL CABLE KHANDWA MP

=== Indonesia ===
- Biznet Home
- First Media
- IndiHome/IndiHome TV
- MNC Play
- DensTV
- MyRepublic

=== Israel ===
- Hot
- Yes
- Cellcom TV
- Partner TV
- Next TV
- Sting TV

=== Japan ===
- Bay Communication
- BB Cable
- Cable Networks Akita
- CCJ
- Cyubu Cable
- iTSCOM (ITS Communication)
- Japan Cable Net (KDDI)
- JCOM (Jupiter)
- K-CAT
- NNS
- StarCat Cable Network Co.
- Tokai Cable
- Usen Corporation

=== Kazakhstan ===
- Alma tv
- Kazaktelecom

=== Malaysia ===
- Astro
- Unifi TV

=== Maldives ===
- SatLink

=== Philippines ===
- Air Cable
- Asian Vision
- Cablelink
- Now Network
- Parasat Cable Television
- Planet Cable
- Sky Cable

=== Singapore ===
- StarHub TV
- Singtel TV

=== South Korea ===
- LG U+
- SK Broadband
- SkyLife
- Olleh TV

=== Sri Lanka ===
- Ask Cable Vision (Digital & Analog)

=== Thailand ===
- GMMZ
- PSI
- SunBox
- TrueVisions

=== Vietnam ===
- VTV: VTVCab, SCTV
- HTV: HTVC
- Other: Hanoicab (from SCTV), NTH, NACab, GKC, CTD Tay Do... (VTVCab or SCTV network), VTC-CEC (CEC or VTC Digital old)

== Europe ==
=== Albania ===
- ABCom
- APT Cable

=== Andorra ===
- Mútua Elèctrica (Cable Mútua), Sant Julià de Lória)

=== Austria ===
- BKF
- LIWEST
- Salzburg AG
- Magenta Telekom

=== Belgium ===
- Orange Belgium - the second largest mobile operator in Belgium since 2016; operates as a "Cable Virtual Network Operator" (CVNO) using VOO and Telenet networks
- Telenet - in Flanders, Brussels region and Hainaut province. It is the third mobile operator with Base
- VOO - in Wallonia and in some localities of the Brussels region
- Proximus - in Flanders, Brussels region and Wallonia - the largest mobile operator in Belgium;

=== Bosnia and Herzegovina ===
Cable and digital distribution:

- ZipZap d.o.o. - Zenica
- AMB-NET d.o.o. - Živinice
- ASK CATV d.o.o. - Ilidža
- Blic.net d.o.o. - Banja Luka
- CATV SAT d.o.o. - Brod
- ĆUTUK d.o.o. - Žepče
- DUOS - Pale
- ELING-KDS d.o.o. - Teslić
- ELKATEL d.o.o. - Tuzla
- ELNET d.o.o. - Laktaši
- ELTA-KABEL - Doboj
- ELTA-MT d.o.o. - Tuzla
- Europronet - Sarajevo
- FOCUS-M d.o.o. - Milići
- GLOBAL INTERNET d.o.o. - Novi Travnik
- KT SARA d.o.o. - Drvar
- KTV E-G-E d.o.o. - Doboj Jug
- JU Dom Kulture - Žepče
- JU Dom Kulture "Edhem Mulabdić" - Maglaj
- MARIĆ-ŽEPČE d.o.o. - Žepče
- Media Sky - Živinice
- MISS.NET - Bihać
- Neon Solucije - Kalesija
- No Limit Technology d.o.o. - Sanski Most
- ORTAK d.o.o. - Šipovo
- STAR-TEL d.o.o. - Stolac
- STIJENA HERC d.o.o. - Ljubinje
- STOKIĆ d.o.o. - Doboj
- TEHNI-NET d.o.o. - Tržačka Raštela
- TEING d.o.o. - Prozor-Rama
- Telemach - Sarajevo (member of United Group)
- TELINEA - Sanski Most
- TELRAD NET d.o.o. - Bijeljina
- Terc Trade Kompani d.o.o. - Prnjavor
- TV-KABEL d.o.o. - Višegrad
- TX TV - Tuzla
- US TELCOM d.o.o. - Ključ
- WIRAC.NET - Gračanica

Defunct or merged:

- BH Cable Net, Elob, Global Net, ART Net, Telekabel, Mo Net, VI-NET, HS Kablovska televizija, HKBnet, VELNET, VKT-Net, M&H Company, BHB CABLE TV - (merged with Telemach)
- KOMING-PRO - Gradiška (merged with Blic.net)

IPTV distribution:

- SUPER TV by LOGOSOFT Sarajevo
- Moja TV & Moja webTV by BH Telecom Sarajevo
- Open IPTV by M:tel Banja Luka
- HOME.TV by HT Eronet Mostar

DTH distribution:

- Total TV BH Banja Luka (member of United Group)

=== Bulgaria ===
- Ariel TV
- Asparuho NET
- BalchikNet
- Bulsatcom
- CableSat West
- Calbe Com Holding
- Centrum Group
- ComNet
- Coolbox
- Delta
- DigiCom
- Dobrudja Cable
- Escom
- Evrotur Sat TV
- Fiber1
- KoresNet
- LANUtra
- M-sat Cable
- MAXTelecom
- Megalan
- A1
- N3
- NET1
- NetSurf
- Networx
- OnlineDirect
- OrlandoNet
- PanTelecom
- PlayTime
- RN Cable Net
- Skat
- SofiaNet
- Sprint
- TBK
- TCV
- Telecom Group
- TelNet
- TrakiaCable
- Unex
- Unics
- VestiTel
- VideoSat
- Vivacom
- WispBG

=== Croatia ===
- Dastin
- Terrakom
- Vipnet B.net
  - B.net (the merger of DCM and Adriatic Kabel)
- Optima
- Hrvatski Telekom

=== Cyprus ===
- Cablenet
- CYTA
- PrimeTel

=== Czech Republic ===
- ATS, s.r.o.
- Dattel, a.s.
- Dattel Kable Gts telecom
- Elsat, s.r.o.
- InterCable CZ
- K + K Cable, v.o.s.
- Kabel Net Holding, a.s.
- Kabel plus (Cable plus)
- Kabel Plus Střední Morava, a.s.
- Kabelová Televize Jeseník
- Karneval
- KT DAKR, s.r.o.
- KT Ostrava Jih, s.r.o.
- NejTV a.s.
- Pilskabel, a.s.
- TES Litvínov, s.r.o.
- UPC Czech Republic

=== Denmark ===
- ComX Networks A/S
- Tele 2
- Telia
- Stofa
- Waoo
- YouSee

=== Estonia ===
- AS Fill
- Telia
- AS STV
- ITTU Inteko
- OÜ Lassonia
- Telset AS

=== Finland ===
- DNA OYJ
- ElisaCom Oy
- Etelä-Satakunnan Puhelin Oy
- Forssan Seudun Puhelin Oy
- Hämeen Puhelin Oy
- Iisalmen Puhelin Oy
- Jyväsviestintä Oy
- Kajaanin Puhelinosuuskunta
- Kokkolan Puhelin Oy
- Kotkan Tietoruutu Oy
- KPY Kaapelitelevisio Oy
- Kuopion Kaapelitelevisio
- Lännen Puhelin Oy
- Lohjan Puhelin Oy
- Mariehamns Centralantenn Ab
- Mikkelin Puhelin Oyj
- Oulu-TV Oy
- Päijät-Visio Oy
- Pietarsaaren Seudun Puhelin Oy
- Pohjanmaan PPO Oy
- Pohjois-Hämeen Puhelin Oy
- Riihimäen Puhelin Oy
- Salon Seudun Puhelin Oy
- Savonlinnan Puhelin Oy
- Sonera Plaza (TeliaSonera Finland Oyj)
- Teljän Mediat Oy
- Tikka Media Oy
- TTV Tampereen Tietoverkko Oy
- Turun Kaapeli-TV (Turun Kaapelitelevisio Oy)
- Vaasan Läänin Puhelin Oy

=== France ===
- SFR
- Bouygues Telecom
- Orange
- Numericable
- Free
- Canal+

=== Greece ===
- Hellenic Cable Networks
- Cinobo
- Nova

=== Germany ===
- Bosch Telekom
- Cable One
- SkyDSL
- Deutsche Telekom
- GdW Bundesverband
- Kabel & Medien Service (Munich)
- Vodafone Deutschland
- KomRo (Rosenheim)
- Primacom
- Tele Columbus

=== Hungary ===
- Antenna Hungária (MinDig TV, the free terrestrial digital broadcasting)
- Délkábel Kft.
- DIGI Kft. (formerly known as Egyesült Magyar Kábeltelevízió)
- DSP Befektető Rt.
- HCS
- Invitel Távközlési Zrt.
- KableVision
- KFKI Számitástechnikai Rt.
- Magyar Telekom NyRt. (formerly known as T-Home, T-Kábel, and MatávKábelTV)
- Németkábel Vagyonkezelő Rt.
- PR Telecom Zrt
- Szélmalom Kábeltévé
- Vodafone Hungary

=== Italy ===
- Sky omc

=== Ireland ===
Largest (available nationally)

- Eir
- Sky Ireland
- Virgin Media Ireland

Smaller independent cable operators

- Magnet Entertainment _{(IPTV over fiber FTTH)}
- Smart Telecom _{(IPTV over fiber FTTH)}
- Smyth Cablevision

Defunct Irish cable companies (mostly gradually merged into what is now Virgin Media Ireland)

- Cablelink^{(rebranded as NTL)}
- Casey Cablevision (acquired by Virgin in 2018)
- Chorus Communications _{(became UPC in 2007)}
- CMI (Cable Management Ireland)_{(merged to form Chorus)}
- Cork Multichannel/Cork Communications _{(became Chorus)}
- East Coast Multichannel _{(merged to form Chorus)}
- Horizon _{(merged to form Chorus)}
- Irish Multichannel _{(merged to form Chorus)}
- Marlin CATV _{(merged to form Cablelink)}
- NTL Ireland _{(became UPC in 2007)}
- Phoenix Relays _{(merged to form Cablelink)}
- Ren-Tel Cablevision _{(The Rank Organisation; merged to form Cablelink)}
- RTÉ Relays _{(merged to form Cablelink)}
- Sky Scan Cablenetwork Kumaramputhur _{(merged to form Cablelink)}
- SCTV Digital (Cork)_{(Went bankrupt in 2010)}
- Westward Cable _{(merged to form Chorus)}

=== Kosovo ===
- IPKO
- Kujtesa

=== Lithuania ===
- Balticum (acquired Rygveda)
- Cgates Group (Cgates, Mikrovisata, Kavamedia, Satela, Ukmerges televizija, Rakaras, UKMNET) - largest cable company in the country
- Elekta
- Eteris
- Funaris
- Ignalinos televizija
- Ilora
- Init Group (Init, Vinita, Dokeda, Druskininku Televizija)
- KLI LT
- Lansneta
- Marsatas
- Parabolė
- Roventa
- Splius
- Televizijos komunikacijos
- TEO AB - largest TV operator in the country (IPTV and DTT networks)
- Transteleservis
- Viasat (only DTH operator)
- Viltuva
- Zirzilė

=== Monaco ===
- MC Cable

=== Montenegro ===
- Telemach

=== Netherlands ===
Regional

Cable companies that serve a larger area:

- Caiway - Westland
- DELTA - Zeeland
- Kabel Noord - north-east Friesland
- Ziggo - largest cable company in the Netherlands in multiple regions

Local

Cable companies which only serve one municipality or town:

- CAI Assendorp - Assendorp-Zwolle
- CAI Bleiswijk - Bleiswijk (digital services by Ziggo)
- CAI Edam-Volendam - Edam-Volendam (digital services by Ziggo)
- CAI Harderwijk - Harderwijk
- Cogas KTMO - Almelo (digital services by CAIW)
- Groenstichting Rozendaal - Rozendaal (services by Ziggo)
- Kabelnet Veendam - Veendam
- Kabeltelevisie Waalre - Waalre (services by Ziggo)
- Kabeltex - Texel
- KTV Pijnacker - Pijnacker
- Rekam - Gouda

=== North Macedonia ===
- Telekabel
- Blizoo

=== Norway ===
- Altibox
- Allente
- Telia
- Homebase
- RiksTV

=== Poland ===
- ASTA-NET
- ELSAT
- INEA
- Jambox
- KORBANK
- Netia
- Play
- Petrus
- Promax
- Ultra HD Sat
- Vectra

=== Portugal ===
- NOWO
- MEO
- NOS - Zon and Optimus fusion in 2014
- Vodafone

=== Romania ===
- Akta S.A
- Analog S.A.
- Astral TV SRL (UPC)
- Canad Systems Ltd
- Conex Sat Ltd
- Cony Sat S.A & Megaconstruct S.A.
- cRD S.A.
- CVR S.A.
- Delta TV Ltd
- Digital 3 S.A.
- FX Communication S.A.
- RCS & RDS
- Satba Ltd
- Seltron Ltd
- Strorm TV Ltd (UPC)
- Telekom Romania
- TV Cablu Ltd
- TVS Holding Ltd
- Vodafone Romania (FX Internet Ltd, CVR S.A., Canad Systems Ltd, Digital 3 S.A, Genius Ltd., Seltron Ltd, Portal Ltd, Analog S.A., Diplomatic Ltd, EuroSat Ltd, Satba Ltd, Conex Sat Ltd, Satline Co. SRL Călărași)

=== Serbia ===
- SBB
- Supernova
- Orion Telekom

=== Slovakia ===
- ANTIK
- Digi TV Slovakia
- Orange Slovensko
- SATRO
- Skylink
- Slovak Telekom
- Slovanet
- SWAN
- UPC Broadband Slovakia

=== Slovenia ===
- AMIS d.o.o.
- ANSAT d.o.o.
- ARIO d.o.o.
- CATV SELNICA-RUŠE d.o.o.
- DOMCOMMERCE d.o.o.
- DRUŠTVO KKS PRAGERSKO-GAJ
- DRUŠTVO uporabnikov KTV Ekran
- Društvo za razvoj kabelsko distribucijskega sistema Črna na Koroškem
- EKDS d.o.o.
- ELCATEL d.o.o.
- ELEKTRO TURNŠEK, d.o.o., Celje
- ELEKTRONIKA - KATV d.o.o.
- ELSTIK d.o.o.
- ELTA d.o.o.
- EVJ ELEKTROPROM d.o.o.
- GOROSAN ELEKTRONSKE KOMUNIKACIJE d.o.o.
- INATEL d.o.o.
- INTEL Branko Šetinc s.p.
- KA-TV TOLMIN
- KABEL TV d.o.o.
- KABELSKA TELEVIZIJA NOVA GORICA
- KABELSKA TELEVIZIJA RADENCI
- KATV BOVŠKE, BOVEC
- KATV LIVADE d.o.o.
- KKS d.o.o.
- KKS RADEČE d.o.o.
- KKS SLIVNICA d.o.o.
- KRAJEVNA SKUPNOST CERKNO
- KRS d.o.o.
- KRS LENART d.o.o.
- KTV ORMOŽ
- KTV RAVNE d.o.o.
- KTV ŠENTJAŽ
- M3-NET d.o.o.
- NAKLO d.o.o.
- OMREŽJE d.o.o.
- P&ROM d.o.o.
- SANMIX d.o.o. Cerknica
- SKYLINE d.o.o.
- STUDIO PROTEUS, d.o.o., POSTOJNA
- SVISLAR TELEKOM d.o.o.
- T-2 d.o.o.
- TELE-TV d.o.o.
- TELEING d.o.o.
- TELEKOM SLOVENIJE d.d.
- TELEMACH d.o.o.
- TELES d.o.o.
- TELESAT d.o.o.
- TOTAL TV d.o.o.
- TRNOVEC MILAN s.p.
- TUŠMOBIL d.o.o.
- ZAVOD KABELSKE TELEVIZIJE, NHM SEVNICA
- ZAVOD KTV NA JAMI, LJUBLJANA
- ZAVOD ZA RAZVOJ KABELSKO-SATELITSKO TELEVIZIJSKEGA sistema Kamnik

=== Spain ===
National

- Vodafone (All regions except the Basque Country, Asturias, Galicia, Extremadura, Ceuta and Melilla)

Regional

- Euskaltel (Basque Country)
- PTV Telecom (in Spanish) (Andalusia, Valencia and Madrid)
- R (Galicia)
- Telecable (Asturias)

=== Sweden ===
- Allente
- Tele2
- SAPPA
- Telenor

=== Switzerland ===
- Finecom
- Naxoo
- Sunrise

=== Turkey ===
- Digiturk
- Dsmart
- Tivibu
- Turksat A.S.

=== United Kingdom ===
- BT
- Virgin Media
- Sky
- TalkTalk

== Oceania ==
=== Australia ===
- Foxtel
- Fetch TV

=== New Zealand ===
- Freeview NZ (free to air television)
- SKY Network Television (satellite television)
- One NZ (digital cable television)

== See also ==
- List of multiple-system operators
- List of sovereign states by number of broadband Internet subscriptions
- List of countries by number of Internet users
- List of countries by number of telephone lines in use
- List of countries by smartphone penetration
- List of telecommunications companies
- List of mobile network operators
- Triple play (telecommunications)
