= Media in Hamilton, Ontario =

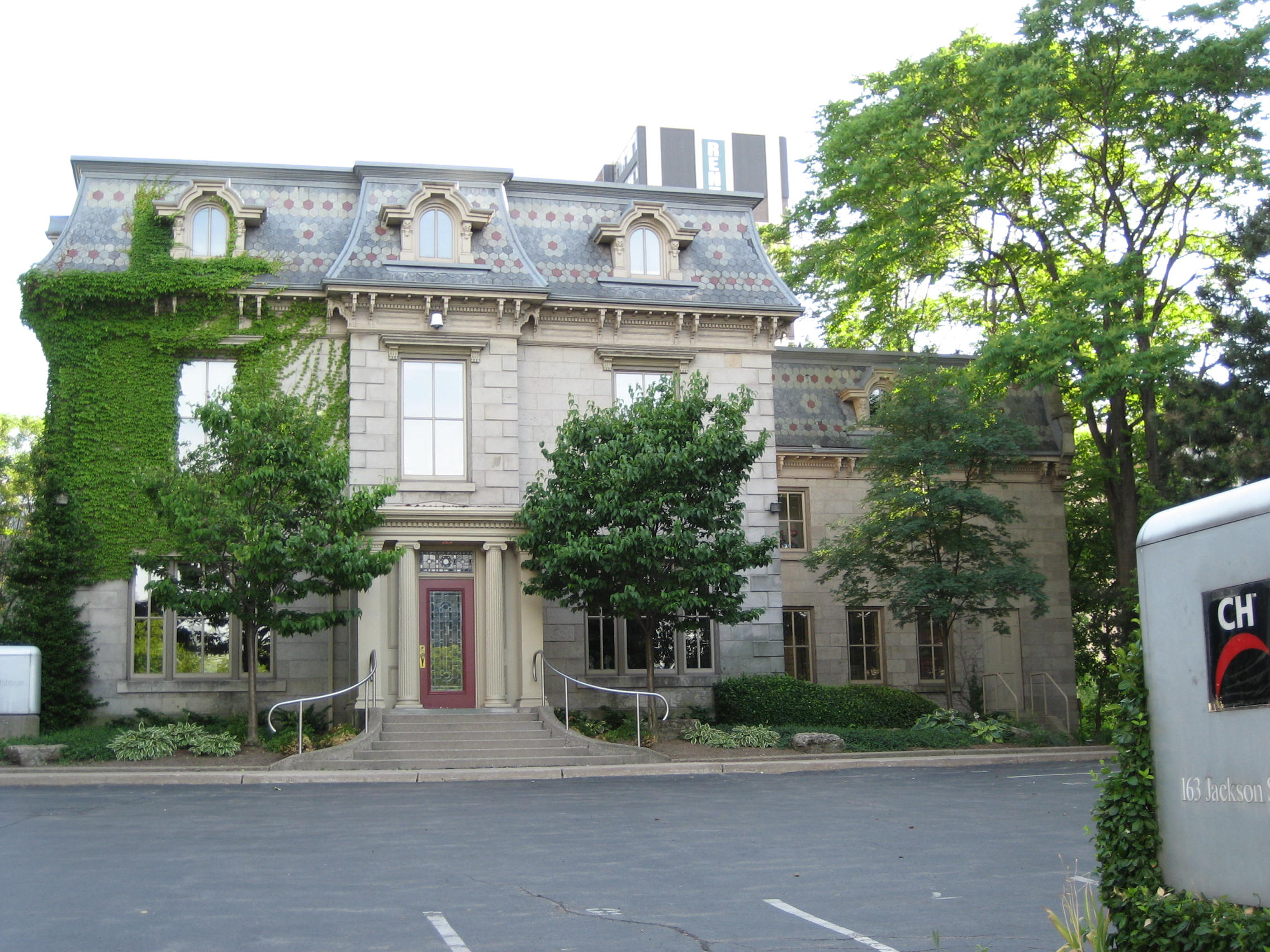
Former CHCH-TV studio building in Hamilton

The following is a list of media outlets for Hamilton, Ontario:

== Radio ==
Hamilton has seven FM stations and three AM radio stations. Two of the stations are operated by local post-secondary institutions, one is news/talk and one airs a comedy format.

On September 19, 2007, the CBC organized a meeting in Hamilton at the Hamilton Convention Centre to discuss the idea of bringing a new radio station to the city, citing that "Hamilton was the largest, and most underrepresented city in the country in terms of media coverage." In early 2012, the CBC confirmed its final plans for a new local news service in Hamilton; see "web" section below for further details.

Frequency	Call sign	Branding	Format	Owner	Notes
AM 820	CHAM	Big AM 820	multicultural (punjabi music)	Neeti Prakash Ray	
AM 1150	CKOC	1150 CKOC	classic hits	Neeti Prakash Ray	
FM 93.3	CFMU-FM		campus radio	McMaster University	
FM 94.7	CHKX-FM	KX 94.7	country	Durham Radio	
FM 95.3	CING-FM	Energy 95.3	hot adult contemporary	Corus Entertainment	
FM 101.5	CIOI-FM	Indi 101.5	campus radio	Mohawk College	
FM 102.9	CKLH-FM	Legend 102.9	adult hits	Whiteoaks Communications Group	
FM 107.9	CJXY-FM	Y108	active rock	Corus Entertainment	Licensed to Burlington but marketed toward Hamilton

Most of Toronto's radio stations also cover Hamilton.

=== Defunct Radio Stations ===
Frequency	Call Sign	Notes
AM 900	CHML	The station seized operations in August 14, 2024.

== Television ==
Hamilton is part of the Toronto television market and receives most broadcast television from Toronto. CHCH is the only television whose studios and operations are based out of Hamilton, and provides local programming. CITS is an owned & operated of the Yes TV system, but does not air any local programming, and is based out of neighboring Burlington. CBC Television (CBLT-DT), City (CITY-DT), Radio-Canada Télé (CBLFT-DT) and TVOntario (CICA-DT) are received directly from the networks' Toronto transmitters on the CN Tower. CBC once had an affiliate in Hamilton, as CHCH was affiliated with the network from its sign on in 1954, until 1961. Global can be received from CIII-DT's Broadcast relay station in Paris, or the station's Toronto transmitter on the CN Tower; CTV service may be received either from CFTO-DT (Toronto) or CKCO-DT (Kitchener), with both stations available on most local cable systems. CTV Two is provided over-the-air by a local rebroadcaster, due to the distance of the CKVR-DT main transmitter in Barrie from Hamilton.

Television stations based in Hamilton include:

OTA virtual channel (PSIP)	OTA actual channel	Rogers Cable	Cogeco	Source Cable	Call sign	Network	Notes
11.1	15 (UHF)	12	12	12	CHCH-DT	Independent	
35.1	35 (UHF)	71	22	18	CHCJ-DT	CTV 2	Rebroadcaster of CKVR-DT (Barrie)
36.1	36 (UHF)	19	17	35	CITS-DT	Yes TV	
–	–	14	14	14	–	Cable 14	Community channel operated jointly by all Hamilton cable providers

In addition, many of the Buffalo, New York TV stations reach Hamilton over the air and some are carried on local cable.

Cable service in Hamilton is divided up between two different cable companies: Cogeco and Rogers Cable (the former third independent company, Source Cable, is now a Rogers subsidiary). Each system holds a monopoly in a specific part of Hamilton.

== Print ==
=== Newspapers ===
- Hamilton Community News - formerly known as Brabant Newspapers, publishes weekly editions for Mountain News, Ancaster News, Dundas Star, and Stoney Creek News (now owned by Metroland Media Group) PUBLICATIONS ENDED SEPT 15 2023
- Hamilton Spectator - the city's main daily newspaper; established in 1846; has a daily circulation over 50,000 and over 70,000 weekly readers; owned by Metroland Media Group, a division of Torstar
- Flamborough Review - weekly community paper; owned by Metroland Media Group
- Presencia Latina - monthly Spanish-language community paper
- Le Régional - weekly French-language community paper

=== Other publications ===
- Hamilton City Magazine – published by Hamilton City Publishing Inc.
- Coffee News - Ancaster edition
- Coffee News - Dundas/Westdale edition
- Coffee News - Waterdown edition
- Greater Hamilton Musician Annual - a printed compilation of local music news
- Gusto Magazine - free monthly independent wellness magazine for Hamilton Ontario; creator Amy Bonin
- H Magazine
- Hamilton Arts & Letters - online magazine published by Samizdat Press
- Mayday Magazine- a publication of the Sky Dragon Centre
- The Sachem and Glanbrook Gazette
- Unpack Magazine - print and online magazine published by the Immigrant Women's Centre
- Urbanicity - published by Martinus Geleynse; creator Reg Beaudry
- View Magazine - local entertainment weekly

== Web ==
In 2012, the Canadian Broadcasting Corporation announced its plans for a new local news service in Hamilton. With the Hamilton area already within the broadcast range of CBC Radio and CBC Television's services in Toronto, it was not financially or technically feasible for the public broadcaster to launch new conventional radio or television stations in Hamilton; accordingly, the corporation has developed a new model, with Hamilton as its test project, to launch a local digital service that would be accessible on the Internet and telecommunications devices such as tablets and smartphones. The project, CBC Hamilton, launched in May 2012.

Local websites include:

- Greater Hamilton Musician - news for musicians and the music trade in Hamilton, Burlington, Oakville and Brantford; reviews, interviews
- Hamilton Scores! - Hamilton amateur sports news
- Hamilton Tigers - dedicated to bringing the NHL back to Hamilton
- Hamilton Music Awards - annual music awards for bands and artists from the Hamilton region
- Here Magazine - dedicated to local news, mostly arts based
- Urbanicity - daily news articles specializing in openings & closures of local spots
- Raise the Hammer - dedicated to sustainable urban revitalization
- Software Hamilton - covers local tech and startups
- THEZine Arts & Events E-Blasts - online arts, entertainment and business promotion covering Hamilton and the Golden Horseshoe regions
