= Owned-and-operated station =

Broadcast network station owned by the network instead of affiliating

In the broadcasting industry, an owned-and-operated station (frequently abbreviated as an O&O) usually refers to a television or radio station owned by the network with which it is associated. This distinguishes such a station from an affiliate, which is independently owned and carries network programming by contract.

The concept of an O&O is clearly defined in the United States and Canada (and to some extent, several other countries such as the United Kingdom, Australia, Brazil, Argentina and Japan), where network-owned stations had historically been the exception rather than the rule. In such places, broadcasting licenses are generally issued on a local (rather than national) basis, and there is (or was) some sort of regulatory mechanism in place to prevent any company (including a broadcasting network) from owning stations in every market in the country. In other parts of the world (France, Italy, Spain, Chile, Peru, Uruguay) many television networks were given national broadcasting licenses at launch; as such, they have traditionally been mostly (or entirely) composed of owned-and-operated stations, rendering a separate notion for such a concept redundant.

== Usage of the term in the United States ==
In the broadcasting industry, the term "owned-and-operated station" refers exclusively to stations that are owned by television and radio networks. The term "affiliate" applies only to stations that are not owned by networks but instead have contractual agreements to air programming from one of the major networks. While there may be an affiliation agreement between a network and an owned-and-operated station, this is not necessarily required and may simply be a legal technicality formalizing the relationship of separate entities under the same parent company. This does not prevent a network from dictating an owned-and-operated station's practices outside the scope of a normal affiliation agreement. For example, network programming is rarely preempted by O&Os except in cases of major breaking news of interest to the O&O's viewing area, despite individual affiliates' rights to do so.

The term "station" applies to the ownership of the station. For example, a station that is owned and operated by the American Broadcasting Company (ABC) is referred to as an "ABC station" or an "ABC O&O." A station not owned by ABC but contracted to air the network's programming is correctly referred to as an "ABC affiliate".

However, informally or for promotional purposes, affiliated stations are sometimes referred to as a network station, as in "WFAA is an ABC station" even though that ABC affiliate, in the Dallas–Fort Worth market, is owned by Tegna, Inc. A correct formal phrasing could be, "ABC affiliate WFAA is a Tegna station." Similarly, one may informally refer to "ABC affiliates" in regard to stations (including O&Os) that air ABC programming, or to "the ABC affiliation" in regard to the transfer of rights to ABC programming from an affiliate to an O&O.

Some stations that are owned by companies that operate a network but air another network's programming are referred to as an affiliate of the network that they carry. For example, WPSG in Philadelphia is owned by the CBS network's parent company Paramount Global, but has no network affiliation and airs syndicated programming; it is an independent station. Prior to September 2023, WPSG aired programming from The CW, which was owned by CBS at the time; therefore, WPSG was a CW O&O prior to October 2022.

The stations carrying The WB Television Network were another exception. The controlling shares in the network were held by Time Warner through its Warner Bros. division, with minority interests from the Tribune Company and, for a portion of the network's existence, the now-defunct ACME Communications. While Tribune-owned stations such as WGN-TV in Chicago, WPIX in New York City and KTLA in Los Angeles (along with most of the ACME stations) aired programming from The WB, they did not fit the standard definition of an owned-and-operated station. A similar exception existed when UPN was launched in January 1995 by co-owners Chris-Craft and Viacom. Each of the companies owned a number of stations that aired the network. However, the stations were also not considered O&Os under the initial standard definition. This ambiguity ended with Viacom's buyout of Chris-Craft's share of the network in 2000, which came not long after its merger with the previous CBS Corporation. The stations were referred to informally as "UPN O&Os" (Chris-Craft later sold its stations to Fox Television Stations, the subsidiary of the then News Corporation that primarily operates Fox's O&Os, in 2000).

Following the shutdowns of UPN and The WB, CBS Corporation (former owner of UPN) and Time Warner became co-owners of The CW Television Network, which largely merged the programming from both networks onto the scheduling model used by The WB. The network launched in September 2006 on 11 UPN stations owned by CBS Corporation, and 15 WB affiliates owned by Tribune (which exchanged its ownership stake in The WB for affiliation agreements on most of its stations with the new CW network). Certain UPN and WB affiliates in markets where Tribune and CBS both owned stations carrying those networks either picked up a MyNetworkTV affiliation or became independent stations. The standard definition of an O&O again does not apply to The CW, but the CBS-owned stations that carry the network were referred to as "CW O&Os" (Time Warner, later known as WarnerMedia, did not own any station except one during its existence). After Nexstar Media Group (who acquired Tribune in 2019) brought a 75% interest in The CW (Paramount Global and Warner Bros. Discovery, who respectively succeeded CBS Corporation and WarnerMedia, each retain 12.5% ownership), all of the Nexstar-owned CW affiliates became O&Os.

Some O&Os choose to refer to themselves as "network-owned stations" instead, reflecting the fact that while they may be owned by a national network, much of the operation is usually left to the discretion of the local station.

== Distribution ==
=== Asia Pacific ===
Seven's owned-and-operated stations have their master control operations centralised at the network's facilities in Melbourne.

==== Australia ====
In Australia, Seven Media Group, which owns the Seven Network, Nine Entertainment, which owns the Nine Network and Paramount Skydance, which owns Network 10 each own and operate stations in the five largest metropolitan areas (Sydney, Melbourne, Brisbane, Perth and Adelaide). These television markets together account for two-thirds of the country's population. In addition, Seven also owns and operates its STQ station in regional Queensland, its NEN station in Northern New South Wales and the Gold Coast, its CBN station in Southern New South Wales and in the ACT, its AMV station in regional Victoria, its PTV station in Mildura, its TNT station in Tasmania, its NTD station in Darwin, its GTS/BKN station in Broken Hill and Spencer Gulf, its QQQ and ITQ station in Remote Central and Eastern Australia and various stations related to the former GWN7 network in Western Australia while Network 10 also owns and operates its TNQ station in regional Queensland, its NRN station in Northern New South Wales and the Gold Coast, its CTC station in Southern New South Wales and in the ACT and its GLV/BCV station in regional Victoria.

The two national public broadcasters, the Australian Broadcasting Corporation (ABC) and Special Broadcasting Service (SBS), own and operate all of their local stations.

==== Indonesia ====
In Indonesia, although public networks (i.e. RRI and TVRI) own and operate all of their local stations since their early years, the trend of private networks own and operating more than one station only arose in the 2000s, as the restriction on private radio station's broadcast area was lifted and new regulations concerning network broadcasting system was in effect. The situation is similar to that of the neighbouring Philippines (see below), since most of them are transmitter stations with few regional programming (the notable exceptions are the stations of Jawa Pos Multimedia and Indonesia Network, consisting of distinct TV stations owned by same company, with few or none national programming). Also, the terms "network", "station", and "channel" are used interchangeably, and the flagship station (mostly in Jakarta) could be watched on pay TV.

Most of the local private stations that are member of national networks are owned and operated by the same company as their parent network, though they were established as different companies. The stations typically has on-air name format [network name] [city/province], reflecting their respective network and their broadcast coverage. There is only a single counterexample to this rule: RBTV (Yogyakarta) airing in the Special Region of Yogyakarta, is an affiliate of but only 25% shares are owned by Kompas TV.

Due to regulations in the 2002 Act on Broadcasting, currently owned-and-operated radio stations tend to air mostly local programming, while owned-and-operated television stations are allowed to air mostly network's national programming.

==== Japan ====
In Japan, commercial terrestrial television is focused on five organizations, known alternatively by either the name of their flagship Tokyo station or a network name (usually branded as a "news network" although all of these organizations provide more than just news programming).

The four largest of these – Nippon TV (NNN/NNS), Tokyo Broadcasting System (JNN), Fuji TV (FNN/FNS), and TV Asahi (ANN), two of four of them owned by major newspapers (Nippon TV by The Yomiuri Shimbun Holdings and TV Asahi by The Asahi Shimbun Company) and Tokyo Broadcasting System being highly affiliated with The Mainichi Newspapers Co. despite the Mainichi's lack of ownership – each own and operate stations in the Tokyo, Keihanshin, Chukyo and Fukuoka metropolitan areas. These four television markets together account for more than half of the country's population. In addition, these four networks also own and operate some stations in other television markets. Most of the Japanese television stations outside the four flagship media markets have affiliates with one of those networks, therefore, they are not owned-and-operated stations. However, in the strict North American definition of "owned by the network", nearly all of those network affiliates would have been classified as owned-and-operated stations, since the networks (or in the case of Nippon TV, Tokyo Broadcasting System and TV Asahi, the newspapers who own/affiliated with them) has controlling shares in those stations. The smaller TV Tokyo (TXN) clearly owns and operates all of its local stations.

The public broadcaster NHK operates two terrestrial channels, NHK General TV and NHK Educational TV. Both of these channels have some regional stations, all of which are owned and operated by NHK.

==== Philippines ====
In the Philippines, networks such as the former ABS-CBN (which all of these stations being converted into All TV stations), GMA Network, and TV5 own and operate almost all their local television stations, although a few affiliates also exist. As regional stations simulcast/relay almost the entire programming lineup of their parent network's flagship station (usually based in Metro Manila), the terms "network", "station" and "channel" can in practice be used interchangeably to refer to either one. Even when a network's local station features programmes that deviate from the flagship station, viewers there may be able to see the flagship station through pay-TV operators.

In addition, networks are often informally referred to using their flagship stations' terrestrial channel numbers. For example, ABS-CBN is referred to as "Channel 2" or "Dos", which corresponds to the assigned channel number of its Manila O&O DWWX-TV (now All TV's DZMV-TV). This is applicable even if a viewer receives the network on a different channel number (either because the viewer resides in a different viewing area or receives the channel through cable or satellite).

=== Europe ===
==== Germany ====
ARD, one of Germany's public broadcasters, is actually an umbrella organisation made up of the different regional public broadcasters. This effectively renders ARD a case of where the regional stations own the network. One of ARD's channels, Das Erste, has exactly the same output across the country but each of the regional broadcasters contributes content to it. Meanwhile, each ARD-member broadcaster uses channel 3 to show its own output and lineup in the viewing areas they serve (although a common time exists for regional news bulletins at 19.30 and a simulcast of the national newscast Tagesschau at 20.00 Central European time). Within some regional broadcasters, further variations exist for the regional news bulletins. Viewers across Germany are able to view the different regional variations of channel 3 through free-to-air satellite, pay-TV subscription, or through the ARD media library available on ARD's website and mobile app.

==== United Kingdom ====
The ITV network is jointly owned by the owners of the local "Channel 3" stations throughout the United Kingdom, which since 2016 have been consolidated into two companies: ITV plc (whose Channel 3 franchises are branded ITV1) and STV Group plc (which operates its franchises as STV). Officially, the stations own the network, rather than the network owning stations as is the case in most of the other countries listed here. However, since the 2004 creation of ITV plc, which since 2016 has owned and operated all of the Channel 3 licences serving England, Wales, southern Scotland, Northern Ireland and the Channel Islands, as well as the UK-wide breakfast licence, most of the operations of the network have been absorbed into that entity. Moreover, the separately owned station serving northern and central Scotland (STV), and to a lesser extent the ITV plc-owned UTV in Northern Ireland, often deviate significantly from the schedule of the ITV1 channel as programmed by ITV plc. As a result of this restructuring and other changes in the relationship between ITV and STV, the Channel 3 franchises owned by ITV plc could now be considered ITV owned-and-operated stations, with STV being comparable to an affiliate.

From 1982 to 2010, a somewhat comparable situation existed for the fourth channel allocation, with Channel 4 broadcasting in England, Scotland, and Northern Ireland, and S4C, operated by a separate public authority, broadcasting in Wales. Until the digital switchover in Wales in 2010, S4C's analogue service broadcast primarily Welsh-language programming, along with English-language programming from Channel 4, often on delay. In this sense, S4C could be considered a Channel 4 affiliate, with Channel 4's operations in the rest of the UK being similar to an O&O. Since the digital switchover, S4C has been a fully Welsh-language service, with Channel 4 available in Wales at all times on a separate digital channel.

However, S4C has some ties to the BBC even as the latter does not own the former. The licence fee, which is primarily used to fund the BBC, also partly goes to S4C. S4C's main newscast, Newyddion, is broadcast from BBC Wales' studios. Some other BBC personalities like Huw Edwards also appear regularly on S4C. S4C is also available on the BBC's iPlayer for everyone in the UK.

While BBC One has regional output, the BBC produces all such regional programmes itself, and in this sense all BBC "stations" are owned-and-operated; however, as with the ITV network, there are regional variations in scheduling on this channel between the constituent countries of the UK. BBC Two used to have a version for Scotland but on February 17, 2019, this variation was discontinued to make way for a new television channel entitled BBC Scotland (Scotland viewers now get the same version of BBC Two seen in England). Channel 4 offers regional advertising (as did Channel 5 until 2015), but otherwise there are currently no regional programming variations on those channels or on any other UK-wide television channels.

Local Television Limited owns and operates several stations across major metro areas in the UK and is seen on Freeview channel 8. Compared to other established services, each of the owned and operated stations has more hours of content that caters to the viewing areas of such.

Unlike in the US, O&Os intended for a certain viewing area are viewable anywhere in the UK. O&Os from other viewing areas are available on Sky and Freesat and the BBC's iPlayer allows users to select the region/viewing area they are interested in and will thus give them the corresponding BBC One feed. BBC Scotland and BBC Alba are available across the UK through the iPlayer. UTV, the ITV O&O for Northern Ireland is available across the UK but users need to add this channel manually to their Sky or Freesat lineup.

=== Latin America ===
==== Argentina ====
Argentina's TVP owns and operates all of its stations. However, commercial broadcasters like (Telefe, El Trece, América TV and Encuentro) have private affiliates outside Buenos Aires.

==== Brazil ====
In Brazil, government regulations limit the number of stations a television network can own. As a result, the five major television networks (TV Globo, Record, SBT, Band and RedeTV!) tend to have O&Os only in large metropolitan areas such as São Paulo, Rio de Janeiro and Belo Horizonte, and rely heavily on affiliates to distribute the networks' programming to other areas of the country. Some markets (such as Recife and Manaus) also have O&Os from one or more networks; for instance, TV Globo and RedeTV! own and operate their stations in Recife, while SBT, Record and Band do not. Smaller television networks, including (TV Gazeta), typically only have one owned-and-operated station.

==== Chile ====
The major Chilean television networks currently own and operate all of their stations. Canal 13 had an affiliate in northern Chile, Telenorte, until it disaffiliated from the network in 1989.

==== Mexico ====
Due to the lack of an ownership cap in Mexico, some Mexican television networks own and operate all of their stations; a few media companies, such as Grupo Televisa and Azteca own multiple stations in several markets that each carry programming from the various networks that it also owns (or in the case of Televisa, shoehorn programs cherrypicked from its various networks onto one station). However, there are privately owned local stations that still exist, which broadcast programming originating from the stations located in Mexico City.

==== Peru ====
In 1974, Telecentro was created as a division of ENRAD (Empresa Nacional de Radiodifusión), a state controlled company used to operate all of the country's radio and television stations. However, private broadcasters still owned the broadcast stations. When satellite transmission links were introduced in Peru in 1989, many affiliates had become repeaters of the main stations based in Lima.

=== North America ===
==== Canada ====
In Canada, due to the population being concentrated to fewer urban centres (compared to the United States), as well as more lenient policies regarding media ownership (for example, an ownership cap on television stations does not exist, except for within one media market), many television stations have become (or began operation as) O&Os. For instance, CTV and Global currently own and operate an overwhelming majority of their local stations (most of which are located in major urban centres); the few affiliates are located in smaller regional markets like Lloydminster and Thunder Bay.

CBC Television, with its role as the publicly funded broadcaster, has at least one O&O in every single province, as well as CBC North serving the three territories as well as northern Quebec. While the majority of Canadians are served by CBC owned-and-operated stations, the CBC previously had some privately owned affiliates. The number of these particularly decreased in the early 2000s, however, and as of January 2017, no private CBC affiliates remain (the last such station disaffiliated in September 2016), and stations that have left the network since the mid-2000s have generally not been replaced. Indeed, the public broadcaster shut down most of its own TV rebroadcast transmitters in 2012, and now relies instead on cable and satellite carriage of its O&Os in regions outside the largest markets.

The CBC's main French-language network, Ici Radio-Canada Télé, is the only French-language network in Canada that has O&Os located outside Quebec. The network maintains an O&O in each province except in Atlantic Canada, where CBAFT (based in Moncton, New Brunswick) previously served the entire region via relay transmitters (and remains available on cable/satellite). The territories likewise now receive programming through cable/satellite carriage of out-of-province O&Os, usually CBFT Montreal.

The other two French-language networks – Noovo and TVA – only have O&Os (and, for that matter, affiliates) within Quebec (privately owned Radio-Canada affiliates were only found within Quebec as well, the last affiliated station shut down in 2021).

Along with the major networks, some media conglomerates also run second-tier television systems (e.g., Rogers Media's Omni Television and Bell Media's CTV 2). These systems share the same parent companies as most of their local stations, and such stations can be considered O&Os as well. For example, all of CTV Two's local stations are owned by Bell Media. On the other hand, Canwest's E! added a few private affiliates not owned by Canwest in Western Canada prior to its demise in 2009; those affiliates have since joined Rogers' Citytv network.

==== United States ====
In the United States, unlike Canada's O&O-heavy geography, the Federal Communications Commission (FCC) previously mandated that the total number of television stations owned by any company (including a television network) can only reach a maximum market coverage of 39% of the country. Given this restriction, television networks only have O&Os in a fraction of the 210 designated market areas around the country (the remainder of the markets are served by affiliates that are owned by other media companies). Periodically, networks may sell O&Os to comply with this FCC restriction.

O&Os tend to be found in large urban centers such as New York City, Los Angeles, and Chicago, and other markets that are typically among the 10 largest in the U.S. (such as the San Francisco Bay Area, Dallas–Fort Worth metroplex, and Philadelphia), although they have also been found in markets as small as Green Bay, Wisconsin (DMA No. 69, 2006–07) and Toledo, Ohio (DMA No. 76, 1995–2011) in the past. Some networks (such as Ion Television) and non-commercial religious television networks (such as the Trinity Broadcasting Network and Daystar) own the vast majority of their stations, with only a few privately owned outlets carrying their programming (in the case of TBN and Daystar, both networks own their stations directly and through subsidiary licensees, such as Community Educational Television for TBN and Word of God Fellowship for Daystar).

Owned-and-operated stations used to be common in the days of network radio, however beginning in the 1980s, these radio networks began to be broken up. For all intents and purposes, NBC no longer exists as a radio network, beyond brand licensing and distribution agreements with Dial Global for NBC Sports Radio content. ABC was previously non-existent as well, until 2015 when it relaunched an in-house radio network after Cumulus Media Networks, the then-owners and distributors of the ABC News Radio brand, replaced the ABC News brand with Westwood One News (via CNN). CBS's radio stations are now a separate company (CBS Radio) from its broadcast service. In the late 1990s, the original CBS Radio Network was reassigned to then-corporate sibling Westwood One via a series of complicated transactions, absorbing the former Mutual and the original NBC Radio (which General Electric spun off in 1987 after its merger with RCA) in the process. Westwood One was spun off in 2007 and merged into Dial Global in 2011, with the new company taking on the Westwood One name. Today, CBS maintains separate distribution agreements between Westwood One (for CBS Radio News and its sports play-by-play packages, most notably the NFL and the NCAA) and Cumulus Media (for CBS Sports Radio).

However, new radio networks have cropped up with their own owned-and-operated networks. iHeartMedia owns many stations in the top 100 U.S. markets, and in turn feeds them with programming, either from corporate subsidiary Premiere Radio Networks or via internal distribution; in particular, this is done with their talk radio station portfolio. Voicetracking purposes are handled either by internal methods or through their Premium Choice format menus, the latter of which is geared towards small and medium-market stations with air talent selected from stations in larger markets.

Cumulus Media often does the same with its own stations and broadcast service known as Cumulus Media Networks. The Walt Disney Company, which sold off ABC Radio in 2007 to Citadel Broadcasting (which was merged into Cumulus in 2011) still owns the ESPN Radio network. ESPN Radio had only a few owned-and-operated stations in mostly major markets; its last owned-and-operated station disaffiliated from the ESPN Radio network in 2023 after it was sold. Until 2021, Disney also owned the Radio Disney network, and almost all of Radio Disney's outlets prior to its transition to a mainly digitally distributed service in 2014 (leaving Los Angeles flagship KDIS as the network's only remaining O&O until 2017, when it became affiliated with spin-off network Radio Disney Country).

Most religious radio networks, such as Salem Communications, Moody Radio, the Bible Broadcasting Network, and Air 1/K-Love, own and operate all of their stations. The Public Broadcasting Service (PBS) is not allowed to own or operate any of its stations by way of its ownership model, as its individual member stations own the network instead in the manner of ARD.

== Branding ==
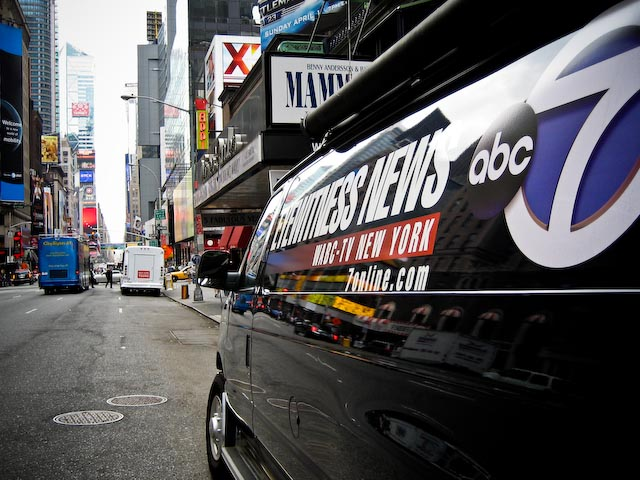
WABC-TV's news vehicle. The circle 7 logo seen here is also used on other ABC O&Os broadcasting on channel 7.

A network's O&Os often share similar branding elements among themselves, reinforcing their common identity as stations owned by the same network; for example, a common shared element among O&O stations involves identifying themselves by combining the name of their parent network with the station's channel number (such as "CBS 2," which is uniformly used by CBS O&Os KCBS-TV in Los Angeles, WCBS-TV in New York City and WBBM-TV in Chicago), which started to become a normal mode of branding in the mid-1990s (beforehand, O&Os of certain networks – such as CBS and NBC – incorporated the network's logo into their own while verbally being referred under a more genericized channel branding). This kind of sharing may also present some savings to the parent network (i.e., the owner), as its O&Os can use the same graphics and music rather than to have each station commission their own individual branding package. Examples include the circle 7 logo (originally designed in 1962 for ABC's aforementioned O&Os, all of which at the time had broadcast on VHF channel 7) and the "This is Chicago, Chicago My Town" musical signature for local newscasts (originally used by WBBM-TV, and later spread to other CBS O&Os). Fox also has a set of branding guidelines for both its O&Os and affiliates. Supposedly, NBC and ABC also have branding guidelines for its affiliates, but not as extreme as CBS or Fox; since the 2013–14 season, however, when ABC unveiled an updated version of its logo, all of the network's affiliates are now required to use the ABC circle logo as a part of the station's own logo, which must additionally be approved by the network for use.

Networks in Canada took corporate branding to its logical conclusion; references to local call signs and channel numbers have almost completely been eliminated from the O&Os except during station sign-on and sign-off sequences (although some O&Os may occasionally refer to their channel numbers in passing).

In the UK, the similar O&O branding elements are prevalent in the continuity sequences, especially when a national BBC News bulletin on BBC One is introduced. In here the regional announcer tells viewers "This is BBC One [name of region]", as well who will present the national and regional news bulletin. The fonts and graphics styles used in the national news bulletins are mirrored in the regional news bulletins. The format and order of segments of the regional bulletins are almost exactly the same as each other. This is also applicable to the weather segments.

In Sweden where Sveriges Television (SVT) owns and operates all its stations, the regional news programme segments have identical graphics elements to each other and to the main national programmes they are either part of (e.g. Morgonstudion) or follow (e.g. Rapport and Aktuellt). For instance, during Morgonstudion, rather than a in-studio presenter stepping in to present the regional news, that segment is a montage of the top regional news reports.

Currently, other television station groups (such as Hearst Television) also implement common branding practices among its stations (even when affiliated with different networks). Some of the branding elements are now used by stations that are not O&Os or even affiliates of a certain network (such as Sunbeam Television's WHDH in Boston and WSVN in Miami using a variation of the circle 7 logo, and ABC affiliate KCRG-TV in Cedar Rapids, Iowa using CBS' "I Love Chicago" motif). Likewise, network affiliates may also license graphics packages for use on their newscasts and imaging from their networks to reduce the costs of licensing imaging from other parties; though it has been reduced in usage than in the past, many affiliate stations also license the network's imaging for their entertainment program and news promotions. Nonetheless, such practices and elements can still be traced back to the O&Os, which represented the earliest television station groups under common ownership, before the emergence and proliferation of national station ownership groups in the subsequent decades.

== Ties to the network and sister O&Os ==
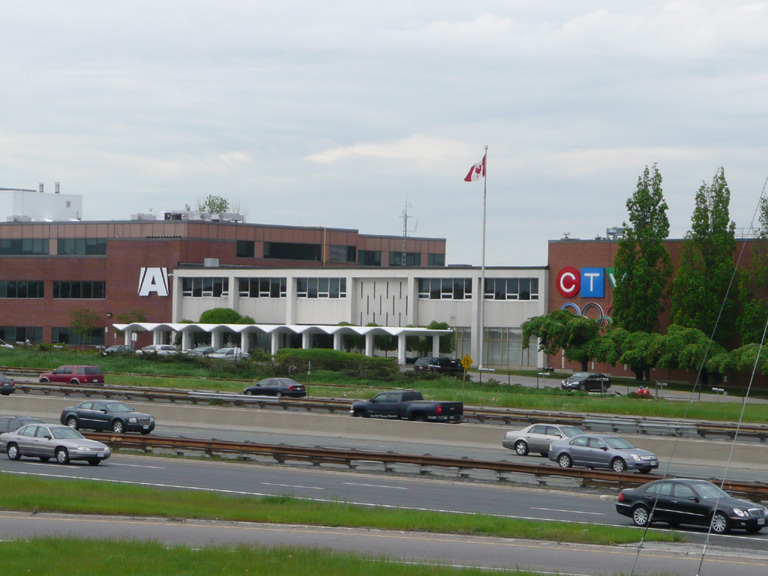
9 Channel Nine Court, home to both CTV's network operations and Toronto O&O CFTO-DT

=== Opportunities for talents and other staff ===
Positions at network O&Os are frequently sought after by those who wish to eventually work for a television network. Many O&Os have served as a stepping stone for television personalities at their parent networks. For example, former Today and NBC Nightly News presenter Tom Brokaw used to work for NBC's Los Angeles O&O, KNBC, before moving to the network while Matt Lauer and Al Roker worked for NBC's flagship O&O in New York City, WNBC-TV, before becoming hosts on Today. Additionally, Roker had begun his career with NBC at former O&O WKYC-TV in Cleveland, known as a "farm station" which developed talent for the larger O&O stations and network (although, until after it ended following Multimedia's purchase of controlling interest in the station in 1990, this strategy left WKYC as a longtime also-ran in the Cleveland market due to heavy staff turnover). Roker's predecessor as the Today show's weatherman, Willard Scott, was an on-air personality at WRC-TV, NBC's O&O in Washington, D. C., before going to New York in 1980. Another example was BBC London News presenter Emily Maitlis, who joined BBC News 24 and BBC Two's Newsnight in 2006.

Although working at an O&O does not guarantee a network job down the line, the on-air presenter or correspondent does potentially receive additional exposure to the network and often a larger audience given that O&Os are often found in the largest media markets. Behind-the-scenes personnel at an O&O station may also be promoted to a higher network-level position. Emmy Award-winning videotape editor Walter Balderson, for example, began his career in television as an engineer at WRC-TV in Washington before eventually becoming NBC's videotape editor for The Huntley–Brinkley Report, as well as other NBC network shows in New York.

Presenters and other staff at the O&Os also take on occasional roles at the network level, alongside their existing capacities at the station/regional level. For example, several local anchors at CTV's O&Os have filled in for Lloyd Robertson in the past on the network's national newscast CTV National News; and weathercasters from CTV's Toronto and Vancouver O&Os (CFTO-DT and CIVT-DT, respectively) present the weather segments on CTV News Channel. A number of personalities at New York City radio and television stations have also done assignments for both a station and a parent network at the same time, due to their proximity to network studios and offices. Likewise, presenters from the network appear on some of their O&O stations' local news bulletins. For instance in the UK, the ITV Lunchtime News presenter also presents the ITV News London bulletin that immediately follows. Another example is BBC's Breakfast, which broadcasts from Media City Salford Quays, the home of BBC North West (serving greater Manchester and Liverpool); BBC North West Tonight Presenter Roger Johnson presents some Sunday editions of Breakfast.

Local weather presenters may make occasional appearances on national programmes or vice versa. In the BBC, the national weather presenters make occasional appearances on BBC London news bulletins and weather presenters often allocated to BBC London (and sometimes other BBC regions) occasionally present the weather for BBC's national bulletins. A similar practice happens over at Swedish network SVT where the regional weather portion in many of the regional news bulletins is presented by one of SVT's national weather presenters.

=== Co-located network and station facilities ===
Parts of a network's operations may also be co-located in the same premises as one or more of its O&Os. For example, production of Global's national newscast Global National is controlled from its Vancouver O&O CHAN-DT, while CTV's network headquarters are co-located with CFTO at 9 Channel Nine Court in Scarborough, Ontario (the address refers to CFTO's over-the-air channel number). NBC's national network operations in both New York City and Los Angeles are housed in the same facilities as their local stations in the respective cities, WNBC and KNBC, and both of these O&Os are considered flagship stations of the network (conversely, NBC's affiliate news service NBC News Channel is based out of the studios of WCNC-TV in Charlotte, North Carolina, which the network maintains an affiliation with but has never owned). Moreover, NBC's Washington O&O, WRC-TV, had previously housed the network's Washington bureau from which Meet the Press and some MSNBC programmes originated from.

Networks and stations share common facilities in some areas. For instance, some BBC London News bulletins also use the same studio (Studio B) as the national BBC News at Six and Ten bulletins. Previously BBC's Studio D, which used to be home to BBC London News, was also occasionally used by the BBC News Channel when the latter's main studio, Studio E, was out of service. Studio D has also been used for the BBC interview programme Hardtalk. The BBC's flagship morning programme Breakfast used to share the same studio as BBC's Northwest Tonight, the BBC's newscast for the region encompassing Manchester, Liverpool, and surrounding areas but since mid-2023, the former has moved to a different studio but still within MediaCity UK.

The co-location of network facilities at O&Os may also facilitate the production of promo shoots that feature both an O&O show and a network show. For instance, the lead presenters of an O&O's late-night news show may shoot a promo in the same studio with the host of the parent network's late-night talk show that airs immediately after the former. Similarly, a network may thus also show promotional posters/billboards for the programmes of the O&O station it is co-located with along that network's office/studio corridors.

=== Content sharing and contribution ===
In the US, during the early stages of breaking news in an O&O's market that may be of potential national interest, its sister O&Os elsewhere may rely on a correspondent working for the former to provide on-air updates. In addition, the news websites of major networks have local news sections and rely on their O&Os for that. Likewise, the ABC News app on Apple TV has a local news section with video reports prepared by its different O&Os. In connection, the O&Os share their content on each other's websites and social media feeds (e.g. content originating from KABC-TV Los Angeles are occasionally posted on WABC-TV New York).

In the UK, some BBC regional offices (e.g. BBC Bristol, BBC Wales/Cymru, BBC Scotland) are credited for producing some BBC programmes like Dr Who, Question Time, and Bargain Hunt.

In Germany, some programmes that air on ARD's national channel Das Erste are produced by regional stations that are members of the ARD network.

In the Philippines, GMA Network's regional stations contribute to and power a daily news bulletin focused on regional news that airs nationwide on sister network GTV.

== Ownership and network changes ==
In general, an O&O is very unlikely to experience changes in its ownership, since it is often a significant source of revenue for its owner; and since its owner is also its parent network, the chances for an O&O to ever switch networks are also rather low – unless the station is, on the rare chance, sold to another network.

However, in instances where the network finds an O&O to be no longer financially viable, it may choose to sell the station to a new owner or, in severe cases, simply close the station. Even profitable O&Os might be sold off, often as a result (or in anticipation) of mergers and corporate deals, especially ones which put the network over the ownership limit in its local jurisdiction (e.g., the aforementioned 39% ownership cap in the United States imposed by the FCC). In addition, a network might decide to sell some of its O&Os and use the money raised to (at least temporarily) alleviate financial problems. Depending on the new owner, the station might continue to carry programming from the same network, affiliate with another network, or even become another network's O&O.

The following are examples of transactions involving O&Os:

=== Australia ===
- STW-9 in Perth and QTQ-9 in Brisbane became O&Os of the Nine Network in 1987, when the parent company of both stations, Bond Media (headed by Alan Bond), purchased the network. After that company's collapse, STW-9 was sold to Sunraysia Television and remained a Nine Network affiliate; it later came under the ownership of WIN Television until Nine Entertainment Co. bought the station in 2013, and turned STW-9 into a Nine O&O once again. QTQ-9, meanwhile, always remained a Nine O&O during that time.
- NEW-10 in Perth signed on the air in 1988 as a Network Ten O&O. However, the station was sold off the next year as the network faced financial problems. The network – under CanWest Global ownership – re-acquired the station in 1995, and NEW-10 has remained a Ten O&O ever since.

=== Canada ===
"We can get rid of this baby!" CKVU-TV's Joe Leary takes the Global mike flag off his microphone on the station's last day as a Global O&O.

- CKVU-TV in Vancouver was purchased by CanWest Global in 1988, subsequently becoming part of that company's CanWest Global System (renamed the Global Television Network in 1997, as part of a national expansion of that brand outside what became the new network's Paris, Ontario flagship CIII-TV). However, in 2000, CanWest purchased the television stations of Western International Communications (WIC), which included CHAN-TV in Vancouver and CHEK-TV in Victoria. The Canadian Radio-television and Telecommunications Commission (CRTC) does not allow any single company to own more than two stations serving the same market that broadcast in the same language; as a result, Global had to sell one of the stations. It opted to keep CHAN as that station had much higher ratings than CKVU, as well as a network of rebroadcasters that reach 97% of British Columbia. CKVU was eventually sold to CHUM Limited, and became part of the Citytv television system (now simply known as City, which has since been re-classified as a television network).
- After purchasing the WIC stations, Canwest started a parallel system, first known as CH, and later as E!, for the WIC stations in areas overlapping existing Global stations (such as the aforementioned CHEK). However, in the midst of financial difficulties, Canwest stated in 2009 that "a second conventional TV network [was] no longer key to the long-term success" of the company, and the five E! O&Os subsequently faced various outcomes: CHCH-TV in Hamilton and CJNT-TV in Montreal were sold to Channel Zero and were converted into independent stations; CHBC-TV in Kelowna became a Global owned-and-operated station; CHCA-TV in Red Deer closed down on August 31, 2009; and CHEK-TV in Victoria was sold to a consortium of station employees and local investors for $2, and now operates as an independent station.
- Shortly after purchasing the Global network following Canwest's bankruptcy in 2010, Shaw Communications realigned a small station it already owned, CTV affiliate CJBN-TV in Kenora, with Global. However, the station retained its local branding and continued to be managed by Shaw's Kenora cable operation. When Shaw sold its Shaw Media arm to Corus Entertainment in 2016, CJBN was not included in the sale. CJBN thus transitioned from a Global O&O to an affiliate; however, both Shaw and Corus are controlled by the family of JR Shaw, which means that CJBN was thereafter considered a de facto Global O&O. Shaw ultimately decided to close CJBN entirely later in 2016.

=== United States ===
- In December 1993, the National Football League awarded Fox the broadcast contract to televise games from the National Football Conference. As a result, it agreed to purchase a 20% stake in New World Communications. Many of the television stations that were owned by New World were located in major NFC markets, and switched to Fox between September 1994 and September 1996 (including two – WGHP in Greensboro, North Carolina and WBRC in Birmingham, Alabama – that ended up being turned over to a blind trust before they were acquired by Fox directly, due to ownership conflicts caused by New World's concurrent purchases of stations owned by Citicasters and Argyle Communications). New World Communications would be acquired by Fox in July 1996, making them owned-and-operated stations when the merger was finalized in January 1997.
- In July 1994, Westinghouse Broadcasting (also known as Group W), the broadcasting division of Westinghouse, announced a deal to affiliate three of its stations with CBS. While WBZ-TV in Boston and WJZ-TV in Baltimore switched to CBS (from NBC and ABC, respectively) on January 2, 1995, the affiliation swap involving KYW-TV was delayed in Philadelphia when it was discovered that a cash sale of WCAU to NBC would have resulted in huge taxes that were required to be paid on top of it. NBC traded ownership of KCNC-TV in Denver, Colorado, KUTV in Salt Lake City, Utah and the VHF channel 4 allocation in Miami to Group W to solve the problem, with the two O&O swaps and the Miami channel swap taking place on September 10 of that year. Westinghouse merged with CBS in August 1995, resulting in these stations becoming owned-and-operated by CBS, with Group W becoming CBS Corporation by early 1997 (KUTV would later be sold to Four Points Media Group in 2008). As a result of the merger, CBS was required to sell former ABC affiliate WPRI in Providence, Rhode Island (which was sold to CBS in the spring of 1995 and swapped affiliations with WLNE-TV on the day the affiliation swap was completed) due to a significant signal overlap with WBZ-TV.
- In December 2015, NBC announced it would not renew its affiliation with Sunbeam Television-owned affiliate WHDH (which gained its affiliation as part of the aforementioned Group W/CBS affiliation deal in an affiliation swap with WBZ-TV) once its affiliation contract with the network expired on December 31, 2016. Initially, NBCUniversal wanted to transfer NBC network programming to WNEU-TV, which had a decent signal that covered the New Hampshire portion of the market, but was only receivable over-the-air in the northern areas of Boston. Sunbeam's owner, Ed Ansin, told the Boston Globe that "No network has elected to give up such a strong station and go to a startup station," after having disclosed that he had rejected a $200 million offer to sell WHDH to NBC in September 2015, leading the network to threaten to shift its programming to WNEU; however, he still predicted that NBC would remain on channel 7. NBCUniversal later announced that it would acquire Telemundo affiliate WTMU-LD (which would change its callsign to WBTS-LD) in August 2016; the sale of WTMU would be completed in November of that year. On October 18, 2017, NBC agreed to purchase WYCN-CD, a Nashua, New Hampshire-based Class A station that had also sold its frequency rights as part of the spectrum auction. Previous owner OTA Broadcasting then entered into a channel sharing agreement with the WGBH Educational Foundation to carry WYCN-CD's signal over WGBX-TV to serve as the full market simulcast for WBTS-LD once NBC acquired WYCN's license. The sale of WYCN-CD to NBC was completed on January 18, 2018; On August 8, 2019, WBTS and WYCN swapped call signs, with channel 8 becoming WYCN-LD and channel 15 changing to WBTS-CD. On August 31, 2019, WYCN-LD shut down its RF channel 46 transmitter; that October, it moved to channel 36, relocated its transmitter to Norton, Massachusetts, switched from NBC to Telemundo, and changed its city of license to Providence, leaving WBTS-CD as Boston's sole NBC station.
- In October 2022, Nexstar Media Group purchased a majority stake in The CW from Paramount Global and Warner Bros. Discovery, who retained minority stakes in the network. Nexstar had previously acquired Tribune Media in 2019, and with its CW affiliates in most major markets. As such, those stations and other existing Nexstar-owned CW affiliates effectively became CW O&Os, resulting in the CBS-owned CW O&Os merely becoming affiliates. This includes several stations that run the network on a digital subchannel, including those receiving programming from small-market feed The CW Plus, and stations owned by other entities such as Mission Broadcasting and Vaughan Media, which Nexstar provides services through local marketing agreements.
  - On May 5, 2023, CBS announced that its eight CW affiliates would drop the network and go independent in September, with the intention of adding more local programming, including live sports, as well as programming from other Paramount properties. As part of the above deal of Nexstar acquiring a majority stake in The CW, CBS was given the right to end its CW affiliations.
  - On June 14, Nexstar announced that three of its MyNetworkTV affiliates would switch to The CW to replace three of these eight CBS-owned stations.
  - On August 31, Nexstar announced that KAUT-TV would affiliate with The CW beginning September 1, replacing KOCB as part of an agreement with Sinclair to affiliate with two of its stations in Pittsburgh and Seattle.

== See also ==
- Concentration of media ownership
