= Cablecasting Limited =

Canadian cable television company

Cablecasting Limited (CL Systems Limited) was Canada's fifth largest cable television company serving cities in western Canada and some small towns in Ontario. The two major shareholders of the company were David R. Graham, who owned 99.1%, and Noel R. Bambrough who owned 0.1%.

They owned cable facilities in the following markets:

One of Cablecasting's cable companies

- Greater Winnipeg Cablevision
- Calgary Cable TV/FM (served Calgary North)
- Airdrie, Alberta
- Cochrane, Alberta
- Tillsonburg, Ontario
- Thames Cablevision of Strathroy, Ontario
- Allview Cable Service of St. Thomas, Ontario
- Graham Cable serving City of York and parts of Toronto
- Lakeshore Community Television serving Terrace Bay, White River, Red Rock, Nipigon, Marathon, Manitouwadge and Wawa, Ontario.

== History ==
In May, 1980, a U.S. subsidiary of Cable America Inc., Cablecasting Ltd. bought up 80% of a cable company in the state of Dekalb Cablevision Inc., serving 16,000 households in De Kalb, Georgia.

Before SHAW Communications bought up these assets for $307,500,000 in 1992, Cablecasting Limited had 320,000 subscribers in the systems listed above. It was the fifth largest cable company in Canada.

After an asset swap between Shaw and Rogers Cable in 2001, most of the areas formerly served by Cablecasting are now held by Rogers Cable.

== CRTC License-related ==
- CRTC Decision 1992-829 - Sale of Cablecasting Limited assets to SHAW Cable

== See also ==
Classicomm
