= Cable 14 =

Broadcasting network

- Cable 14 logo
- Type: Cable television; Community channel
- Country: Canada
- Availability: Ontario, Canada
- Founded: 1970; 55 years ago
- Headquarters: Hamilton, Ontario
- Broadcast area: Ontario, Canada
- Owner: TV Hamilton Limited: Cogeco – 66.67%; Rogers Communications – 33.33%
- Parent: TV Hamilton Limited
- Established: 1970; 55 years ago
- Launch date: 1970; 55 years ago
- Former names: Cable 8 (1970-1982); Cable 4 (1982-1986)
- Picture format: 1080i HDTV
- Former affiliations: Shaw Communications; Source Cable
- Official website: www.cable14.com
- Language: English

Cable 14 is a community channel that is licensed to Hamilton, Ontario. It is available to cable television subscribers of both Cogeco and Rogers Cable (including the former Mountain and Source systems) in Hamilton, Dunnville, Caledonia, Hagersville, Jarvis and Cayuga in Haldimand County.

== About ==
The channel is controlled by its parent company TV Hamilton Limited, which is jointly owned by Cogeco and Rogers. Cogeco owns majority interest in the company at 66.7%. The board of directors is made up of representatives of both cable companies.

=== Programming ===
The station airs programming of interest and benefit to the community. Programming includes Kiwanis TV Bingo, which is the longest running community television program in Canada. Each year this program raises funds for local charities. In the 2005-06 season, over $250,000 was raised through Kiwanis TV Bingo and went right back to the community. Cable 14 also airs several community sports events, including games played by Hamilton's Mohawk College and McMaster University sports teams, and provincial hockey league coverage with The OHL Tonight.

The station also airs several programs of different interests, including sports, lifestyle, politics, and current affairs. Staff-produced shows include The Hamilton Network, which morphed from former daily current affairs program, City Matters and the lifestyle magazine program Hamilton Life, which aired new episodes twice each week but ended in 2018.

During the annual Hamilton Film Festival, the channel broadcasts the festival's short film programs.

In September 2011, Cable 14 increased access to the station for members of the community, allocating the 10 pm hour on weekdays and 9 am-noon on Saturdays, to community producers for certain topics with Access Hamilton. Such shows include Hamilton Talks, The Opinionators and The O Show.

At election time Cable 14 provides all-candidate debates for each of the local ridings and wards, as well as full election night coverage with a focus on local races, including Haldimand.

A number of local personalities have hosted shows on the channel, including Karen Bertelsen, Doug Farraway and Mike Nabuurs.

In 2015, Cable 14 NOW was launched, allowing viewers to watch live and on-demand video content online.
