= Nextbox =

NextBox may refer to:

- Xbox 360, a home video game console
- NextBox, a set-top box by Rogers Cable
