= Mattr =

Canadian materials technology company

Mattr Corp.
- Formerly: Shawcor Ltd.
- Type: Public
- Traded as: TSX: MATR
- Industry: Oil & Gas Equipment Services
- Headquarters: Toronto, Ontario, Canada; Houston, Texas, United States
- Area served: Worldwide
- Key people: Kevin Nugent (Chairman); Mike Reeves (CEO); Tom Holloway (CFO)
- Products: Spoolable Composite Pipes, Underground Storage Tanks, Wire and Cable, Heat Shrinkable Tubes
- Number of employees: 6,000 – November 2017
- Website: www.mattr.com

Mattr Corp., formerly known as Shawcor Ltd., is a Canadian materials technology company, based in Toronto, Ontario, and listed on the Toronto Stock Exchange. In 2017, it had a revenue of $1.56 billion. It was founded by Francis Shaw, the father of the founder of Shaw Communications, and there was substantial ownership in both companies by the Shaw family for many years.

== History ==
Shawcor was founded by Francis Shaw in rural Lambton County. It was originally a construction company, but later expanded into pipeline coatings, cable television, and numerous other businesses. In the 1970s, the business was split between Francis's sons Leslie and JR Shaw; Leslie inherited the pipeline services business, which became the current Shawcor, while JR Shaw inherited the western cable business, which became Shaw Communications. Under Leslie's leadership, the company grew significantly; by 2002, it had a market capitalization of $1 billion, and 43 plants in 20 countries. Around that time, Leslie ceded his leadership of the business to his daughter, Virginia Shaw.

In 2012, Shawcor suggested that it might consider putting itself up for sale. At the time, the company had a market capitalization of about $3 billion. The company eventually decided not to sell, causing to share price to fall 15%. In 2013, it eliminated its dual class share structure, under which the Shaw family controlled the majority of voting shares.

== Operations ==
Shawcor operates through 2 Segments: Composite Technologies (Flexpipe and Xerxes) and Connection Technologies (AmerCable, DSG Canusa and Shawflex). It has about 100 manufacturing and service facilities and sales offices and 6000 employees in 25 countries.

Former logo of Shawcor Ltd.

The previous pipe coating solutions division - which was the largest division in the company until its sale to Tenaris at the end of 2023 - was formerly part of Halliburton. At that time, it was named Bredero Price. Shawcor acquired the portion of the division it did not already own for $200 million in 2002.

== See also ==
- List of oilfield service companies
