= CUC Broadcasting =

Canadian media company

CUC (Conway Upper Canada) Broadcasting was a Canadian media company, active from 1968 to 1995. Active primarily as a cable television distributor, the company also had some holdings in broadcast media and publishing.

The company was founded in 1968 by chairman Geoffrey Conway, with shareholders including Jerry Grafstein, Michael Koerner and Ken Lefolii.

== Holdings ==
The company's Trillium Cable division served several markets in Ontario, including Scarborough, Windsor, Barrie, Pickering, Smiths Falls, Perth, Chatham and Leamington, and was also a minority investor in other smaller cable companies, including Northern Cable in Northern Ontario, UMG (Upper Midlands Group) Cable in Brockville, Cobourg and Port Hope, and several local systems in The Midlands region of England.

CUC's broadcasting holdings included radio stations CKLW and CKEZ in Windsor, and a 25 per cent founding stake in YTV, which had increased to 34 per cent by the company's dissolution in 1995. Through its share in Northern Cable, it also held a stake in that company's radio and television subsidiary Mid-Canada Communications until its share of that company was bought out by local shareholder Norman Bradley in 1989.

In addition, the company held a significant minority stake in the magazine Toronto Life.

== Acquisition ==
Conway's death in 1988 made the company a strong takeover target, and by 1989 an active struggle for the controlling share of the company was under way. Control was ultimately maintained by Julia Conway, Geoffrey's widow.

CUC sold its radio stations in Windsor to CHUM Limited in 1993. The deal was approved by the Canadian Radio-television and Telecommunications Commission, and formally established the commission's current practice of granting the Windsor market a special exemption from its normal concentration of media ownership rules because the city's proximity to the Metro Detroit market in the United States was threatening the financial viability of Windsor's radio and television services.

CUC was acquired by Shaw Cable in the 1990s, for a purchase price of $645 million. First announced in April 1994, the deal was reached as part of a bidding war which also saw a competing offer from Cogeco. The purchase received CRTC approval in February 1995.

The merger of CUC's 420,000 subscribers with Shaw's, along with an additional 102,000 subscribers added from Shaw's simultaneous purchase of Classicomm, made Shaw the second largest cable company in Canada.

Shortly after the takeover was approved, Shaw cut 251 jobs from Trillium in the engineering, customer service and finance departments, due to operational redundancies with Shaw's existing staff.

Following an exchange transaction between Shaw and Rogers Cable in 2001, most of Trillium's and UMG's former markets are now served by Cogeco, with Scarborough and Barrie now being served by Rogers Cable.
