= Shaw Mobile =

Defunct Canadian mobile phone company

- Type: Division
- Industry: Mobile network operator
- Founded: July 30, 2020; 6 years ago
- Defunct: April 3, 2023; 3 years ago
- Fate: Acquired by Rogers Wireless
- Headquarters: Calgary, Alberta, Canada
- Area served: Canadian provinces of Alberta and British Columbia
- Services: Mobile telephony, SMS, MMS, mobile broadband (LTE and HSPA+)
- Parent: Shaw Communications
- Website: www.shawmobile.ca

Shaw Mobile was a mobile virtual network operator (MVNO) owned by Shaw Communications, providing services in the Canadian provinces of Alberta and British Columbia. It was acquired by rival Canadian mobile phone company Rogers Communications in 2023.

== History ==
Announced on July 30, 2020, it operated on the Freedom Mobile network, which had been acquired by Shaw in 2016. It was sold exclusively as a bundled add-on for Shaw's home internet services, offering up to six lines with unlimited talk and texting for free, and 25 gigabytes of mobile data for $45 per-month. The service was positioned primarily as a competitor to Telus; by contrast, Freedom is marketed as a competitor to the major carriers' flanker brands (such as Fido, Koodo, and Virgin).

In 2023, Rogers Communications acquired Shaw; although Freedom Mobile was sold to Quebecor as part of the merger, the divestiture excluded the 450,000 Shaw Mobile customers. On April 4, 2023, Shaw Mobile was discontinued for new subscribers; existing customers are being transitioned to comparable Rogers Wireless plans, and will be afforded a five-year price guarantee.
