= CJBN-TV =

Television station in Kenora (1980–2017)

- Kenora, Ontario; Canada
- Channels: Analog: 13 (VHF)
- Branding: CJBN

Programming
- Affiliations: Global

Ownership
- Owner: Shaw Communications; (Shaw Cablesystems Ltd.)
- Sister stations: CKND-DT

History
- First air date: 1980
- Last air date: January 27, 2017
- Former affiliations: CTV (1980–2011)
- Call sign meaning: Initials of Carl Johnson and Bertil Nilson, the founding owners

Technical information
- ERP: 0.178 kW
- HAAT: 86.6 m (284 ft)
- Transmitter coordinates: 49°46′16″N 94°31′19″W

CJBN-TV (channel 13) was a Global-affiliated television station licensed to Kenora, Ontario, Canada. The station was owned by Shaw Communications under its cable systems unit, and was not part of the Shaw Media unit which was sold to Corus Entertainment in 2016. CJBN's studios were based alongside Shaw's local offices on 10th and Front Streets in Kenora, and its transmitter was located near Norman Dam Road in Kenora. The station was carried on Shaw Cable channel 12, Bell Satellite TV channel 224 and Shaw Direct channel 320.

It was, with just 178 watts of power, the lowest-powered television station operating on a regular license in North America. This distinction was formerly tied with KJWY in Jackson, Wyoming (now WDPN-TV in Wilmington, Delaware/Philadelphia), until that station increased its power to 270 watts at the time of the digital television transition in the U.S. It was therefore the lowest-powered Canadian television station affiliated with a major network. Its main method of distribution was via sister company Shaw Cable, and other cable and satellite services.

In a letter to the CRTC on November 30, 2016, Shaw Communications announced it would not renew the station's license and intended to close the station on January 27, 2017.

== History ==
CJBN-TV first signed on the air in 1980, with a transmitter power output of 17.5 watts; the station was started by local businessmen Carl Johnson and Bertil Nilson. It was co-owned with Norcom Telecommunications, whose cable systems served Kenora and surrounding areas. With a potential audience of only 5,800 households, it was Canada's smallest television market. It remains the smallest designated market area in Canada, and the second smallest in North America (behind Glendive, Montana).

The station came about after Norcom applied to operate a Central Time Zone Satellite Relay Distribution System (SRDU), and as such, needed a CTV signal. Winnipeg's CKY-TV, which was the closest CTV affiliate to Kenora, was unavailable, so Norcom applied for, and was successful in gaining their own CTV station. The company also planned to set up a series of rebroadcasting stations to expand into nearby areas, but when Cancom secured the main licence for the Northern Service uplink, Norcom was left with just CJBN. With the local economy dependent on the pulp and paper industry, the station's future remained precarious, especially with the increase of competing satellite services available in the area.

In 1983, the station proposed setting up rebroadcast transmitters in nearby communities:

- CJBN-TV-1 Dryden
- CJBN-TV-2 Fort Frances
- CJBN-TV-3 Sioux Lookout
- CJBN-TV-4 Ignace
- CJBN-TV-5 Red Lake
- CJBN-TV-6 Ear Falls

CJBN logo (2007–2010). Second logo under the ownership of Shaw, this logo completely dropped the "CJTV" moniker used by previous logos.

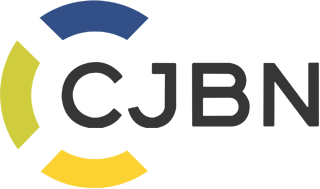
CJBN logo (2010–2011)

CJBN's final logo (2011–2017)

In 1985, CJBN-TV increased its power to 177.5 watts. In 1988, the station told the CRTC that they could not afford to construct the rebroadcast transmitters, and would remain with just one transmitter in Kenora. In place of the rebroadcast transmitters, the station was carried on cable in Red Lake, Sioux Lookout and Ear Falls, and later on, was added to the cable systems in most towns in Northwestern Ontario, including Dryden, Fort Frances, and Ignace.

In 1999, the station was brought before the CRTC to explain the lack of Canadian content, but two years later, its licence was renewed, once evidence of renewed effort toward Canadian content was proven. In 2000, CJBN started to brand itself as "CJTV", but would revert to the CJBN-TV designation after its purchase by Shaw Communications. Four years later in 2004, cable systems in nearby areas and national satellite services began to carry CJBN.

On August 9, 2006, Shaw Communications announced an agreement to purchase Norcom, including CJBN. As Shaw itself did not previously own any broadcast assets, there was some speculation that the struggling CJBN would be resold to CTV to become a repeater of CKY-TV (Shaw had itself sold CKY to CTV following a similar acquisition in 2001). However, the company decided to keep CJBN. CRTC approval of the sale was announced in November 2006.

Shaw Cable-TV Winnipeg announced in April 2007 that it would add CJBN to the digital signals offered to Winnipeg subscribers and placed CJBN on ch. 68.

Shaw Communications acquired Canwest's broadcasting assets, including the Global Television Network, in 2010. In response to deficiency questions from the CRTC regarding its application to acquire those assets, made public in July 2010, Shaw stated that it had no plans to disaffiliate CJBN from CTV and make the Kenora station a full Global O&O. The cable provider said it would negotiate to extend CJBN's affiliation agreement with CTV, which was set to expire on August 31, 2010, at the time. However, on December 1, 2011, CJBN dropped all CTV programming and became a full Global station, adopting a schedule similar to nearby Global station CKND-DT in Winnipeg. As a result of the switch, CJBN became a de facto Global owned-and-operated station, even as it was the only Shaw-owned television station that was owned by the company outright rather than Shaw Media, but the station did not call itself "Global Kenora" under the branding conventions of the network's other O&O stations, identifying instead by its callsign (in the manner of privately owned Canadian television stations).

Kenora cable subscribers, both analog and digital, continue to have access to CTV programming through CKY-DT, which was carried on Shaw's basic cable service in Kenora and area on CJBN's previous cable channels (including channel 4 in Kenora), with CJBN relocated to cable 12, the channel previously used by CKND.

CJBN was not included in the 2016 sale of Shaw Media (including the Global network and most of its stations) to Corus Entertainment. It remained under Shaw Communications ownership and was therefore technically a Global affiliate, but remained a de facto O&O insofar as both Shaw Communications and Corus are controlled by the family of JR Shaw.

On November 30, 2016, Shaw announced the closure of the station, citing duplication with CKND. In a letter filed to the CRTC, Shaw stated that it was in the process of notifying the affected parties of the closure. The company also said that CJBN's two locally produced programs, Fishing with Gussy and Good Morning Sunset Country, will continue to air locally on Shaw TV Kenora. Three jobs have been affected by the closure, which occurred on January 27, 2017.

== Programming ==
As of its closure, the station carried a similar schedule to CKND-DT, the Global-owned station in Winnipeg, including its local newscasts, with the exception of CJBN airing shows such as local production The Weekend Adventurer and Urban Rush. The station was examined by the Canadian Radio-television and Telecommunications Commission in 1999 for not airing enough Canadian content. Since this occurred, the station aired the required amount of Canadian programming.

From the station's launch until its disaffiliation from CTV in 2011, the station's programming was primarily sourced from CTV, with the remainder of the schedule rounded out by Global and syndicated programming, although the exact balance varied from season to season. As with many smaller independently owned Canadian stations, there were also several infomercials throughout any given day's schedule.

== Newscasts and local programming ==
Despite being the only full-fledged station in the area, CJBN never produced much local content. A full-fledged news department was not considered feasible for the station due to the market's small population. Instead, the stations simulcast most local news programs produced by Global-owned Winnipeg sister station CKND-DT (with the exception of that station's weekend 6 p.m. newscast). For many years, the station's only newscasts were two-minute segments, which were combined into a review program at the end of the week.

In 2008, CJBN began airing a news and issues show called Points North which aired eight times per week: Monday, Wednesday and Friday evenings at 6:30 and 11:30 p.m., and weekend evenings at 6:30 p.m. It also aired other special programs aimed at tourists and local residents. In late 2011, Points North became a lifestyles show and its airtime was cut back to weekend evenings at 6:30 p.m. The show was later cancelled in February 2013 to make way for The Weekend Adventurer, which launched in April 2013.

CJBN also aired a half-hour regional news program, Northwest Newsweek, which was produced in Thunder Bay by Thunder Bay Television. NewsNation anchor Ashleigh Banfield began her career at the station.

On May 20, 2016, CJBN aired its final 2-minute news update. This update was used to announce a new local morning program that began airing on CJBN on June 3, 2016, called Good Morning Sunset Country. This morning show aired on Fridays at 8:30 a.m. and covered Northwestern Ontario news as well as featured local guests.

== Digital television ==
CJBN was not required to participate in the mandatory digital conversion that took place in most larger markets on August 31, 2011. The station never converted to digital as of the closedown of their operations on January 27, 2017.

== See also ==
- Shaw TV Kenora
