= Shaw Court =

Coordinates: 51.050°N 114.075°W

Rogers Court, formerly Shaw Court, is the former headquarters of Shaw Communications in Calgary, Alberta, at 630 3 Avenue SW. Shaw was acquired and amalgamated into Rogers Communications in 2023, with the building now holding offices for Rogers as well as a Rogers Mobile outlet store on the ground floor.

== Location ==
Rogers Court is located at the intersection of 3 Avenue and 6 Street SW on the north edge of downtown Calgary.

== Functions ==
Apart from being the main operations base for Shaw's Alberta interests, Shaw Court was also home to Corus Entertainment's three Calgary radio stations: Country 105, Q107, and AM 770 CHQR. In September 2015, these stations were moved to their current location at 3320 17th Avenue SW.

Shaw court has a 2 level underground parkade.

== 2012 fire ==
On July 10, 2012, an electrical fire wiped out radio stations, internet service, 911 service in the downtown core, cable TV service and much of city hall's phone system. Three radio stations - Country 105, AM 770 and Q 107 - were off-air.

== See also ==
- Shaw Communications
- Corus Entertainment
- Rogers Tower
