= Source Cable =

Television service

- Type: Subsidiary
- Industry: Media and Communications
- Founded: Hamilton, Ontario (1974, as SouthMount Cable, Limited)
- Fate: Merged into Rogers Communications
- Headquarters: Hamilton, Greater Toronto Area, Niagara Region
- Products: Cable TV, Internet, Telecommunications, Broadcasting
- Website: www.sourcecable.ca

Source Cable (formerly known as Southmount Cable Limited) is one of three main cable television service providers for the city of Hamilton, Ontario. The other two are Rogers Cable (in the former Mountain Cablevision / Shaw territory) and Cogeco. Each company has a monopoly on traditional cable service in a specific part of the city of Hamilton (but all three compete with Bell Fibe TV and the two national satellite providers); Source Cable's service area is south of Limeridge Road to the end of the original Hamilton city limits (south, east and west), as well as newer urbanized areas south of Rymal Road into the former Glancaster.

On October 23, 2014 it was announced that Source Cable had agreed to be acquired by Rogers Communications for $160 million. The transaction was completed at the end of the year, and Source Cable Limited was merged into another Rogers subsidiary on January 1, 2015, ceasing to be a separate corporate entity. However, Rogers has continued to use the "Source Cable" brand in that company's former service area as Rogers begins the integration process.

Rogers announced on April 15, 2021 that they would phase out the Source Cable name in order to migrate former subscribers to the Rogers Ignite TV service. The transition is expected to be completed by the end of 2022.

== See also ==
- Cable 14
