= Digicable =

Cable television company in India

Digicable Network India Pvt Ltd is a cable television company based in Mumbai, India, that also provides telephone, data, and internet services. The company provides services in 46 cities and 14 states across India and, as of June 2012, had approximately 8.7 million subscribers. It was founded in 2007.

In July 2010 Reliance Communications announced it agreed to acquire Digicable and would rename it Reliance DigiCom. However, a year later, the deal was still under review. In 2012 the company became a takeover target after new rules introduced by the Indian government required cable firms to convert to digital television technology, which analysts thought would lead to consolidation in the cable television industry.
