= Monaco Telecom TV =

Cable television company in Monaco

MC Cable (formerly MC Cable) is a cable television company for the Principality of Monaco owned by Monaco Telecom. It offers two services: a universal service with over 80 channels and a box-based service with over 200 French and foreign TV and radio channels.

== History ==
The company was established in 1990 as Société Monégasque de Télédistribution (Somodi or SMT), as a result of a cabling law forbidding television antennas from being installed inside the country. As of 2000, the company was one of Vivendi's subsidiaries.

In 2001, SMT was taken over by Monaco Telecom and was renamed MC Cable.

In 2010, it launched its new VDSL offer, upgrading to an IPTV system. The universal service (six analogue channels) was replaced by a new, 18-channel one.
