= Reliance Communications =

Defunct Indian telecommunications company

Reliance Communications Limited
- Type: Public
- Traded as: NSE: RCOM; BSE: 532712
- ISIN: INE330H01018
- Industry: Telecommunications
- Founded: 15 July 2004; 22 years ago
- Founder: Anil Ambani
- Defunct: May 2018; 8 years ago
- Fate: Bankruptcy (Mobile Network Division)
- Headquarters: DAKC, Navi Mumbai, Maharashtra, India
- Area served: Worldwide
- Key people: Bill Barney (co-CEO); Srinivasan Gopalan (CFO); Prakash Shenoy (Company Secretary)
- Products: Mobile telephony; Wireless internet; Digital television
- Services: Internet services; Network services; Cloud networking; Data center services; Enterprise voice; Cloud Telephony; Collaboration services; Wholesale voice; Value added services (VAS)
- Revenue: ▲₹4,015 crore (US$420 million) (2019)
- Net income: ▼₹867 crore (US$90 million) (2019)
- Members: 0 (June 2021)
- Number of employees: 3,038 including 1,819 permanent employees (2018)
- Divisions: Mobile network; Internet; Television; Enterprise
- Subsidiaries: Global Cloud Xchange Digicable
- Website: www.rcom.co.in

Reliance Communications Limited (RCOM) was an Indian mobile network provider headquartered in Navi Mumbai, Maharashtra that offered voice and 2G, 3G and 4G data services. In February 2019, the company filed for bankruptcy as it was unable to sell assets to repay its debt. It has an estimated debt of ₹500 billion (equivalent to ₹620 billion or US$6.5 billion in 2023) against assets worth ₹180 billion (equivalent to ₹220 billion or US$2.3 billion in 2023).

As of March 2020, the company reworked its strategy and continues to operate 4G data services, fixed-line communications, data center services, and enterprise solutions as well as subsea cable networks under the banner name, "Global Cloud Xchange".

In July 2025, the loan account of Reliance Communications was classified as Fraud by India's Largest Public Sector Bank - State Bank of India.

== History ==
Reliance Communications was founded in India on 15 July 2004 as Reliance Infocomm Limited with the introduction of its nationwide CDMA2000 service. It became Reliance Communications Limited in 2006. The company introduced its GSM service in 2008. It began using MIMO technology in 2011 to improve the quality of its 3G service, providing a data rate of up to 28 Mbit/s.

In the 2010 spectrum auction, Reliance obtained licenses for 3G spectrum in three cities at a total licensing fee of ₹58.64 billion (equivalent to ₹130 billion or US$1.4 billion in 2023). The company reduced the price of its 3G service by 61 percent in May 2012.

Reliance and Lenovo introduced their co-branded Android smartphones in India in 2013.

The company ended its CDMA operations in 2016, and migrated its subscribers to its GSM and LTE networks by September the same year.

=== Acquisition of MTS India and Digicable ===
On 1 July 2010, the board of Reliance Communications confirmed the acquisition of Digicable India's largest cable network in all-stock deal. The new entity was named Reliance Digicom, which integrated RCOM's DTH TV, IPTV and retail broadband operations with Digicable.

On 14 January 2016, Reliance Communications announced that it had acquired Sistema Shyam TeleServices Limited (SSTL, operating as MTS India) in an all-stock deal. SSTL received a 10 per cent stake in Reliance Communications after repaying its existing debt. Reliance Communications would assume responsibility for instalments that MTS owed the government for spectrum purchases, amounting to ₹3.92 billion (equivalent to ₹5.6 billion or US$59 million in 2023) every year for 10 years. As a result of the deal, Reliance acquired MTS India's subscribers and SSTL's spectrum in the 850 MHz band.

India's antitrust regulator, the Competition Commission of India (CCI) approved the merger in February 2016. The Securities and Exchange Board of India (SEBI) also cleared the deal. SSTL shareholders approved the merger on 18 March 2016. By mid-August, it was approved by tax authorities and the shareholders and creditors of Reliance and SSTL. The merger was approved by the Rajasthan High Court on 30 September 2016 and the Bombay High Court on 7 October 2016. In April 2017, Reliance laid off 600 employees in preparation for its mergers with MTS and Aircel. The Department of Telecommunications gave the final approval for the merger on 20 October 2017. On 31 October 2017, Reliance Communications announced that the merger was complete.

=== Attempted merger with Aircel ===
In September 2016, Reliance Communications announced Aircel had agreed to a merger.

The company announced on 15 March 2017 the Securities and Exchange Board of India, Bombay Stock Exchange, and National Stock Exchange of India approved the merger. The deal was approved by the CCI on 20 March. Aircel and Reliance shareholders approved the merger on 22 and 24 April 2017, respectively, and it was expected to be completed by mid-2017.

However, on 1 October, Reliance allowed the merger agreement to lapse. The deal, which was expected to help the company repay ₹250 billion (equivalent to ₹350 billion or US$3.6 billion in 2023) of debt, was cancelled due to delays by entrenched competition. Reliance was looking at other options to meet their obligations under the SDR agreement and avoid insolvency proceedings by banks. Due to the failed Aircel merger, the company announced to employees in the wireless and DTH businesses on 25 October 2017 that they would be redundant effective 30 November. On 29 December 2017, Reliance discontinued voice services in India and provided only 4G data service.

=== The Ericsson case ===
In 2013, RCom signed a multi-year managed services agreement (MSA) with Ericsson to manage services of wireline and wireless network of 100,000 kilometres (62,000 mi) of fiber and mobile infrastructure in 11 telecom circles in India. This arrangement was a smooth business relationship until 2016, post which RCom struggled to pay the dues. This has been seen as an effect of Reliance Jio that disrupted the Indian telecom industry with its aggressive pricing after its commercial launch in September 2016 that affected all leading telecom players.

By September 2017, Ericsson terminated the MSA and approached the NCLT to recover dues of ₹11 billion (equivalent to ₹15 billion or US$160 million in 2023). By May 2018, the NCLT initiated insolvency proceedings even as RCom tried to sell spectrum and other assets. At the same time, RComm reached out to Ericsson and agreed to pay ₹5.5 billion (equivalent to ₹7.4 billion or US$76 million in 2023) as a settlement with a personal guarantee from Anil Ambani on the condition of withdrawal of insolvency proceedings. The Supreme Court reviewed the matter in August 2018 and ordered RComm to pay up ₹5.5 billion (equivalent to ₹7.4 billion or US$76 million in 2023) to Ericsson by 30 September. RCom failed to comply with the payment and sought an extension of 60 days to comply. Ericsson filed a contempt petition in Supreme court.

In February 2019, the Supreme Court has held Anil Ambani and three others guilty of contempt of court and directed them to make payments by 19 March. In the meantime, Mukesh Ambani, the elder brother of Anil helped him with a bailout of ₹4.63 billion (equivalent to ₹5.8 billion or US$60 million in 2023) which he paid just a day before the deadline on 18 March. Reliance Communications Limited has paid ₹5.5 billion (equivalent to ₹6.8 billion or US$71 million in 2023) to Swedish multinational telecom and networking firm Ericsson a day before the Supreme Court’s deadline, the Anil Ambani-led company said in a statement.

=== Sale of the company's assets ===
During 2020, a consortium of companies bidded upwards of US$200 Million to buy the assets of Reliance Communications. Members of the consortium include NKV Krishna's White Lotus Group, Mukesh Ambani's Reliance Industries, Bharti Airtel, UV Asset Reconstruction (UVARCL) and US-based Varde Partners. In 2022, Mukesh Ambani's Reliance Jio won the bid and acquired the assets of Reliance Communications for Rs. 3720 crores.
