= Access Communications (Nova Scotia) =

Nova Scotia, Canada cable television provider

Access Communications was a major Canadian cable television provider, particularly in parts of Nova Scotia, until its acquisition by Shaw Communications in 1999. Shaw later sold the systems to EastLink in 2001 as it focused on its systems in western Canada.
