= Mountain Cablevision =

Cable television provider in Hamilton, Ontario, Canada

- Industry: Media and Communications
- Founded: 1959
- Defunct: 2009
- Fate: Merged
- Successor: Shaw Communications (system later resold to Rogers Communications)
- Headquarters: Hamilton, Greater Toronto Area, Niagara Region
- Products: Cable TV, Internet, Telecommunications, Broadcasting

Mountain Cable was one of three cable television service providers for the city of Hamilton, Ontario and its surrounding area, specifically the Hamilton Mountain area and Haldimand County. Its operations were acquired by Shaw Communications in 2009, which then resold them to Rogers in 2013. The other two providers in the Hamilton area are Cogeco and Source Cable (formerly known as Southmount Cable).

== History ==
Mountain Cable was founded in 1959 as "General Co-axial Services, Limited"; it specialized in installing Master Antenna systems on apartment buildings, hotels, and resorts.

That same year, The Ontario Housing Corporation (which designed the Buchanan Park subdivision on Hamilton Mountain) was surveying the possibility of building a whole housing project with no above-ground utilities (placing them all underground to improve safety and reliability during storms). The neighbourhood's homeowners approached the company to have General Co-axial Services install a CATV system with the intention of an alternative to bulky and somewhat unsightly roof-top antennas. The homeowners also asked the company to lay the first neighbourhood-wide underground utility lines. The neighbourhood would become the first housing development in all of Canada that would have all of its utilities placed underground, with no utility poles other than street lights. Within two years, over three quarters of the homes in the subdivision were linked to the CATV system.

In July 2009, Shaw Communications announced that it would acquire Mountain Cablevision for $300 million. In September 2009, Rogers Communications sued Shaw to block the sale, arguing that it violated a non-competition agreement which specified that Rogers and Shaw would only operate cablesystems in Eastern and Western Canada respectively. The suit was thrown out, with a judge ruling that the agreement was anti-competitive, and that claims of future harm based on possible Eastern acquisitions by Shaw were "speculative in the extreme".

In January 2013, as part of a larger series of transactions between the two companies, it was announced that Rogers had acquired Mountain Cablevision for $400 million.

In 2014, Rogers began migrating Mountain customers into Rogers service, although the transition was criticized by some users for resulting in technical issues with their services.

== Services ==
In addition to their cable television services, Mountain Cable also offered digital phone and high-speed internet services.

== Community television ==
The local cable television station Cable 14 was partially owned and carried by Mountain; it continued to be partially owned and carried by Shaw, and now Rogers.
