= Rush Communications Ltd. =

Cable TV and broadband provider in Canada

Rush Communications Ltd. was a Cable TV provider in the rural sections of Nova Scotia. It also provides broadband internet access. The company was bought out by EastLink effective September 1, 2007.

== Areas of Operation ==
- Cape Breton
  - Along Trunk 19
  - Port Hawkesbury
  - Richmond County
  - Eskasoni
- Mainland Nova Scotia
  - Annapolis Valley
  - Canso Strait Area
  - Canso
  - Clare
  - Enfield
  - Elmsdale
  - Milford
  - Shubenacadie
