= Classicomm =

Defunct Canadian cable television provider

Classicomm was a small cable provider in Canada serving communities in southern York Region from its offices in Richmond Hill, Ontario.

== History ==
=== Founding ===
Classicomm, or Classic Communications Ltd, was founded in the late 1960s by John O. Graham and Stewart H. Coxford, who were granted a cable television (CATV) licence by the CRTC for Richmond Hill and several other small communities north of Toronto.

=== Growth ===
By the 1980s the cable system had acquired additional licences, and soon covered a geographic area taking in most of southern York Region. With Steeles Avenue as its southerly service boundary, the cable system spanned the width of York Region from Markham in the east to Woodbridge in the west. Its coverage area stretched north to include communities such as Stouffville, King City, Kleinburg and Gormley.

Southern York Region experienced tremendous growth beginning around 1982. During the period of 1986–90 Classicomm was connecting up to 10,000 new subscribers each year, making it the fastest growing cable system of its day.

In 1984, the company applied to the Canadian Radio-television and Telecommunications Commission for permission to launch a classified advertising channel on the service, but the application was denied on the basis that cable companies were not permitted to compete with radio or television broadcasters for advertising revenue. The regulation was changed in 1986 to permit advertising channels. It was also one of the first cable companies in Canada to offer X*Press X*Change, an early foray into electronic news delivery.

=== Sale to Shaw Communications ===
The company was sold in 1995 to Shaw Communications of Calgary, for a purchase price of $240 million. When the transaction was first announced in 1994, Classicomm had 102,000 subscribers; when it was finalized the following year, the company had 105,000 subscribers. Along with Shaw's simultaneous acquisition of Trillium Cable, the deal helped to make Shaw the second-largest cable company in Canada.

=== Sale to Rogers Cable ===
A few years later, Rogers Cable of Toronto and Shaw Cable rationalized their cable holdings in Canada, with Shaw consolidating in western Canada and Rogers in central and eastern Canada. The Classicomm service area is now entirely part of Rogers Cable.
