= Telinea =

Bosnian telecommunications company

- Native name: Telinea d.o.o.
- Company type: LLC (Private)
- Industry: Telecommunication; Cable broadband Cable television Pay television
- Headquarters: Dr. Irfana Ljubijankića 148, Bihać, Bosnia and Herzegovina
- Areas served: Una-Sana Canton; Prijedor area
- Services: MMDS TV; Pay television Broadband Internet; Fixed telephony
- Website: www.telinea.ba

Telinea d.o.o. Bihać is a MMDS TV, IPTV, broadband Internet and fixed telephony service provider in Bihać, Una-Sana Canton, Bosnia and Herzegovina.

The company was founded in 2008 and its headquarters is located in Bihać.
