= JR Shaw =

Canadian businessman (1934–2020)

JR Shaw OC AOE
- Born: James Robert Shaw; August 14, 1934; Brigden, Ontario, Canada
- Died: March 23, 2020 (aged 85)
- Education: Michigan State University Graceland University
- Occupation: Businessman
- Known for: Shaw Communications
- Spouse: Carol Bulman (m. 1956)
- Children: 4
- Parent(s): Lottie and Francis Shaw

JR Shaw OC AOE (born James Robert Shaw, August 14, 1934 – March 23, 2020) was a Canadian businessman. He founded Alberta-based Shaw Communications in 1966 and was the executive chairman of the company. As of 2016, Shaw and other members of his family controlled 85 percent of the Class A voting shares of Corus Entertainment, and 80 per cent of the class A voting shares of Shaw Communications. Shaw sat on the board of directors of Suncor Energy from 2001 to 2007. The School of Business at NAIT is named after him.

== Early years ==
Shaw was born in 1934 in Brigden, Ontario, the son of Lottie and Francis Shaw, and was raised on his family's farm with his siblings, Les, Bertha and Dolly. The Shaw business dynasty originated in rural Lambton County with Francis Shaw, originally from Kimball, who served in World War I. Francis inherited the family farm, and his brother Joel inherited the grist mill.

Lottie Shaw ran the farm, while Francis, an entrepreneur, slowly built a construction company that became a "major contractor involved in Camp Ipperwash" during World War II. Francis Shaw expanded his businesses into "ready-mix concrete, drive-in theatres, cable television", and a "pipe coating" company—and was an innovator in Ontario.

== Education ==
After Shaw earned his Bachelor of Arts in business administration from Michigan State University, he worked for a while at his father's pipe coating company, Shawcor.

== Life ==
Shaw moved to Edmonton in 1961. He was the father of Jim Shaw, who was the chief executive officer of Shaw Communications until his retirement in 2011, and Bradley S. Shaw, the former CEO of Shaw Communications. Shaw Communications has since merged with Rogers Communications as of March 31, 2023.

In 2002, Shaw legally changed his name from James Robert Shaw to JR Shaw. He died on March 23, 2020, at the age of 85.

== Honours ==
According to the History of Canadian Broadcasting, in "recognition of his excellence in business and outstanding community involvement", Shaw was made an Officer of the Order of Canada in 2002. He received the Alberta Order of Excellence in 2008.

Shaw received several honorary degrees, including ones from the University of Alberta, University of Calgary, and Graceland University in Lamoni, Iowa.
