= Shaw Communications =

Former Canadian communications company

Shaw Communications Inc.
- Final logo used from 2012 to 2023

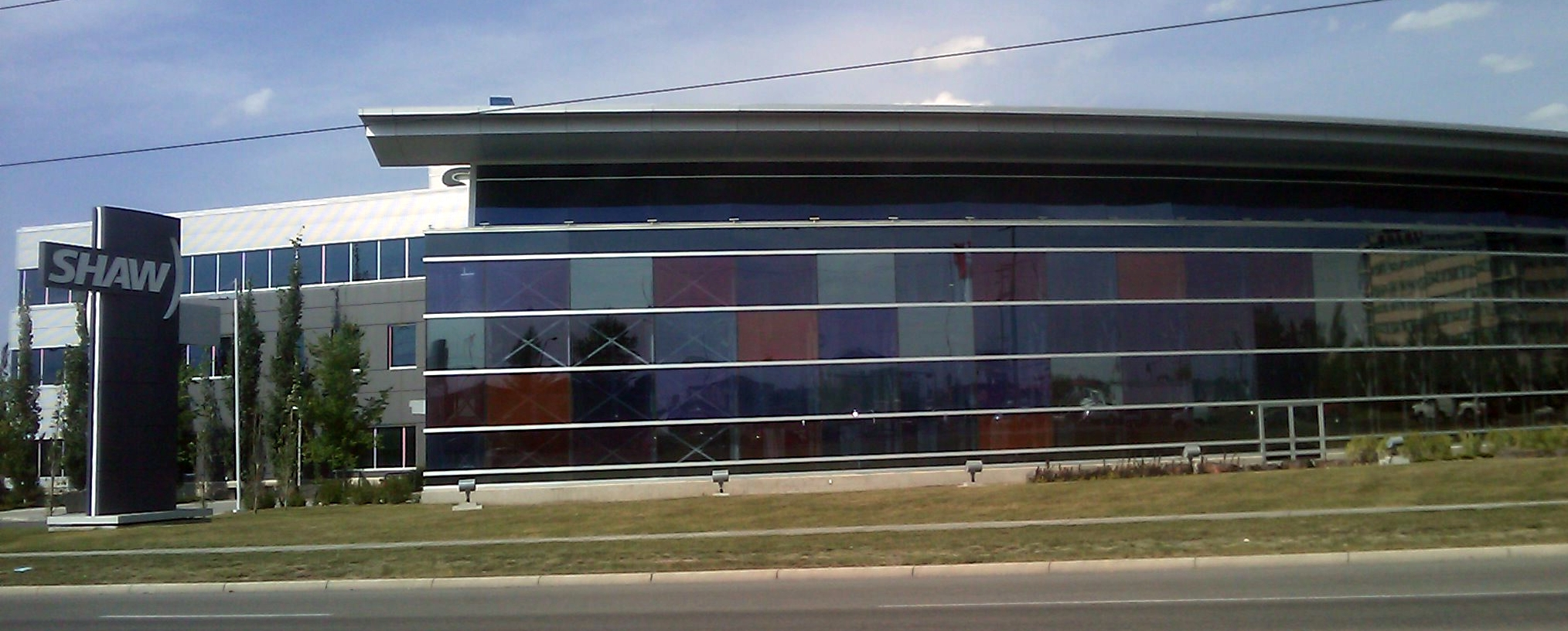
- Shaw's offices in the Shaw Campus
- Formerly: Capital Cable Television Company, Ltd. (1966–1983); Shaw Cablesystems Ltd. (1983–1993)
- Type: Public
- Traded as: TSX: SJR.A (Class A) (voting) (1983-2023); TSX: SJR.B (Class B) (non-voting) (1983-2023); NYSE: SJR (until 2023)
- Industry: Telecommunications
- Founded: 1966; 60 years ago (as Capital Cable Television Company, Ltd.); Edmonton, Alberta, Canada
- Founder: JR Shaw
- Defunct: April 3, 2023; 3 years ago
- Fate: Acquired and merged with Rogers Communications
- Successor: Rogers Communications
- Headquarters: Calgary, Alberta, Canada
- Key people: Bradley S. Shaw (CEO); Paul McAleese (president, COO of Freedom Mobile)
- Products: Cable television, high speed internet, telephone, satellite television, network and specialty broadcasting, logistics tracking, radio
- Revenue: ▲CAD $5.509 billion (2021)
- Operating income: ▲CAD $2.161 billion (2019)
- Net income: ▲CAD $986 million (2021)
- Number of employees: 9,500 (2020)
- Parent: Shawcor (1966–1970s)
- Divisions: Shaw Broadcast Services, Shaw Direct
- Subsidiaries: Freedom Mobile (2015–2023); Shaw Mobile (Acquired by Rogers Wireless)
- ASN: 6327
- Website: www.shaw.ca

Shaw Communications logo, used from 1993 to 1997

Shaw Communications logo, used from 1997 to 2012

Shaw Communications Inc. was a Canadian telecommunications company which provided telephone, Internet, television, and mobile services. The company was founded in 1966 as Capital Cable Television Company, Ltd. by JR Shaw in Edmonton. The company was acquired by and amalgamated into Rogers Communications in 2023; most operations were rebranded to the Rogers brand beginning in July of that year, with services and sponsorships in former Shaw markets having used the transitional brand Rogers together with Shaw for promotional purposes.

At the time of its acquisition by Rogers, Shaw provided home telecommunications services primarily in Alberta and British Columbia and satellite television nationally. It also operated smaller cable television systems in Saskatchewan, Manitoba, and Northern Ontario.

The company also provided mobile services through its subsidiary Freedom Mobile, under both the Freedom and Shaw Mobile brands, in areas of Alberta, British Columbia, and Southern Ontario; Freedom was sold to Vidéotron simultaneously with the Rogers merger. The company's chief competitor for home telecommunications in western Canada was Telus Communications.

== History ==
Shaw was founded in 1966 by JR Shaw as Capital Cable Television Company, Ltd. in Edmonton, Alberta. It was originally a subsidiary of Shawcor, JR's father's firm, but the business was split from Shawcor in the 1970s. The company changed its name to Shaw Cablesystems Ltd. (after founder and chairman JR Shaw) and went public on the TSX in 1983. The company grew during the 1980s and 1990s through acquisitions of firms including Classicomm in the Toronto area, Access Communications in Nova Scotia, Fundy Cable in New Brunswick, Trillium Cable in Ontario, Telecable in Saskatchewan, Greater Winnipeg Cablevision (serving areas east of the Red River), and Videon Cablesystems of Winnipeg (serving areas west of the Red River), which, back in 1998, had itself previously acquired Vidéotron's assets in Alberta. However, two swaps, in 1994 and 2001, with Rogers Cable have resulted in its assets being restricted to Western Canada and a few areas of Northern Ontario. In 1999, Shaw spun out its media properties into a second publicly traded company, Corus Entertainment. In 2001 the Moffat family sold Videon Cablesystems to Shaw.

Prior to 2003, Shaw owned cable systems in the United States previously owned by Moffat Communications, serving six communities in Florida (Eastern Pasco County, Clermont, Palm Coast, Ormond Beach, West Palm Beach and Doral), and the Houston, Texas suburbs of Kingwood, Lake Conroe and Lake Livingston. In February 2003, the Florida systems would be sold to Time Warner Cable (with the West Palm Beach and Doral systems later sold to Comcast, and the other systems spun off to Bright House Networks), while the Texas systems were sold to Cequel III, as part of its then-Cebridge Connections subsidiary (now Suddenlink Communications).

In 2008, Shaw entered the AWS spectrum auction with the intention of possibly becoming a wireless phone provider. The auction ended July 2008, giving Shaw Communications enough spectrum to build a wireless network in its home provinces of British Columbia, Alberta, Saskatchewan, Manitoba and Ontario. This spectrum ultimately went unused and was sold to Rogers Communications in January 2013.

In July 2009, Shaw announced its acquisition of Mountain Cablevision; in September, Rogers sued Shaw to block the sale, citing violations of a non-compete clause. However, the suit was quickly dismissed by the Ontario Superior Court. The purchase was approved by the CRTC on October 22, 2009. The acquisition was Shaw's first cable property east of Sault Ste. Marie since the 2001 swaps with Rogers and Cogeco. Shaw's re-entry into Southern Ontario would be short-lived, as its Hamilton system would be resold to Rogers in January 2013 as part of a deal which also saw unused wireless spectrum sold to the company, and saw Rogers sell its stake in specialty channel TVtropolis.

=== Return to broadcasting ===
On April 30, 2009, Shaw announced a deal to acquire three television stations — CHWI-TV in Windsor, Ontario, CKNX-TV in Wingham, Ontario and CKX-TV in Brandon, Manitoba — from CTVglobemedia. CTV had indicated that it would shut down the stations, all of which were incurring extensive financial losses, later in the year if a buyer could not be found, and had placed them on the market at a price of just $1 each. However, it was reported on June 30, 2009, that Shaw had backed out of the deal and was declining to complete the purchase. CHWI-TV would remain on the air as is; CKNX-TV would become a repeater of London station CFPL-TV in September 2009, while CKX-TV would close down entirely in October 2009.

In February 2010, Shaw announced an agreement with the financially troubled Canwest, whereby Shaw would buy an 80% voting interest, and 20% equity interest, in the restructured entity of Canwest, pending approvals from the CRTC and others. Three months later, following negotiations with rival bidders, the company said it would purchase the entirety of Canwest's broadcasting assets, including the interests in the CW Media subsidiary partially held by Goldman Sachs Alternatives. Canwest's newspapers were not part of the Shaw deal and were sold separately to Postmedia Network.

The acquisition was completed on October 27, 2010, after CRTC approval for the sale was announced on October 22, forming the Shaw Media division.

=== 2012–2023 ===
In June 2012, Shaw underwent a corporate re-branding developed by the Vancouver-based agency Rethink, introducing an updated logo and slogan ("You won't miss a thing"), along with a new promotional campaign featuring the animated characters Bit and Bud—robots who lived in a representation of Shaw's "pipe". The campaign drew comparisons to Bell Canada's former beaver characters of Frank and Gordon, which were overseen by Shaw's then-new chief marketing officer Jim Little while he was at Bell.

In April 2013, Shaw Business Solutions took over Enmax's Envision subsidiary, which had built a fibre-optic network throughout Calgary. The acquisition was completed for $225 million.

final Shaw Communications logo, used since 2012 until 2023

In 2014, Shaw partnered with Rogers Communications to launch Shomi, a subscription video on demand service.

In February 2015, Shaw announced that they would close operations for service call centres in Edmonton, Calgary and Kelowna, and consolidate operations in Victoria, Vancouver, Winnipeg and Montreal. 1,600 of Shaw's 14,000 employees were affected by the consolidation and cuts. The company offered affected employees the option to relocate to its centralized offices, apply for a new job at their location, or leave the company with a severance package for former employees unable to relocate.

In 2013, Shaw attempted to begin developing an IPTV-based platform for its television services. However, after experiencing issues developing the platform, Shaw took a $55 million write-down in June 2015, and announced that it was licensing Comcast's cloud-based Xfinity X1 architecture. In January 2016, Shaw launched its mobile television app FreeRange TV, based on X1 infrastructure, which allows Shaw subscribers to stream selected TV channels and on-demand content. On January 11, 2017, Shaw launched its X1-based cable service, "BlueSky", in Calgary. Shaw later launched Comcast's Xfinity xFi whole-home Wi-Fi platform under the "BlueCurve" branding.

==== Freedom Mobile, divestment of media assets ====
On December 16, 2015, Shaw announced its proposed acquisition of independent wireless provider Wind Mobile from its investors in a deal worth approximately $1.6 billion. The transaction closed on March 1, 2016. Under Shaw, the company was renamed Freedom Mobile in November 2016, coinciding with the launch of its 4G LTE network. The acquisition of Wind was funded by a reorganization in April 2016, which saw the Shaw Media unit transferred to Corus Entertainment, in exchange for $1.85 billion in cash and 71,364,853 class B non-voting shares of Corus. The sale did not include Shaw's 50% stake in the Shomi streaming service and CJBN-TV Kenora; Shomi was shut down in November 2016 and CJBN-TV Kenora was shut down in January 2017.

=== Acquisition by Rogers ===
On March 15, 2021, Rogers announced that it would acquire Shaw for $26 billion, subject to regulatory and shareholder approval. This proposed acquisition was criticized by public lobby groups like OpenMedia, as a move that would reduce national competition in the Canadian wireless communication market by removing one of the four major competitors from the market.

For the sale to go ahead, the CRTC ordered Rogers to divest Freedom Mobile. It was reported on June 17, 2022 that Quebecor, a media and telecommunications company based in Quebec, intended to acquire the company for 2.85 billion. The CRTC approved the merger on March 24, 2022.

On May 9, 2022, the Competition Bureau announced an application to the Competition Tribunal to block the transaction due to its effects on the wireless market.

On August 1, 2022, Rogers announced that the merger was expected to be completed at the end of the year; however, on October 25, 2022, it was announced that the Rogers-Shaw merger had been rejected as proposed. On January 24, 2023, Canada's Federal Court of Appeal allowed the merger to proceed. The merger was approved by the federal government on March 31, 2023, and completed on April 3. Immediately following the transaction, Shaw Communications was amalgamated into Rogers Communications, and no longer exists as a separate entity, though some subsidiaries such as Shaw Cablesystems may still exist as distinct legal entities.

== Other activities ==
Shaw was the parent of Shaw Broadcast Services (previously Shaw Satellite Services, Canadian Satellite Communications, or Cancom) and, through Shaw Broadcast Services, Shaw Direct, one of Canada's two national direct broadcast satellite providers. For many years it also owned a number of radio stations and specialty television services; these assets were later spun off into Corus Entertainment in an effort to satisfy a now-repealed CRTC policy discouraging cross-ownership of cablesystems and specialty services.

== Internet usage-based billing ==
In December 2010, Shaw filed complaints with the CRTC to have competing internet video services such as Netflix classified as broadcasters under Canadian law. In the same month, Shaw introduced usage-based billing on internet plans and lowered plan caps an average of 25% while introducing overage fees of $1 to $2 per gigabyte. On February 8, 2011, Shaw agreed to put a hold on usage-based billing for its services and to this date continues to not charge customers any overages for surpassing Internet data caps.

== Eponymous buildings ==
- Shaw Court, Calgary (head office)
- Shaw Tower, Vancouver
- Shaw Centre, Ottawa
- Shaw Park, Winnipeg (November 2010 to November 2023)
- Shaw Centre for the Salish Sea not-for-profit cultural and learning centre sponsored by Shaw Communications, Sidney, British Columbia

== See also ==
- Burning Log
- Canwest
- Classicomm
- List of assets owned by Shaw Communications
- Media ownership in Canada
- Shaw Multicultural Channel
- Telecom
- List of internet service providers in Canada
- YTV
