= Rogers Cable =

Canadian cable television service provider

- Trade name: Rogers Xfinity
- Type: Division
- Industry: Cable Services
- Founded: 1967; 59 years ago, in Brampton, Ontario, Canada
- Headquarters: Toronto, Ontario, Canada
- Products: Cable television Cable Internet (Rogers Xfinity Internet)
- Revenue: $1.95 billion CAD
- Operating income: $708 million CAD
- Number of employees: 5,922 (2004)
- Parent: Rogers Communications
- Website: rogers.com

Rogers Cable, also known as Rogers Xfinity, is Canada's largest cable television service provider with about 2.25 million television customers, and over 930,000 Internet subscribers. Rogers Cable is a division of Rogers Communications Canada Inc., the operating unit of Rogers Communications Inc.

The division adopted the Rogers Xfinity brand in October 2024, as part of a brand and technology licensing agreement with U.S. cable provider Comcast, which operates its consumer telecommunications division under the brand Xfinity.

== History ==
Rogers Cable logo prior to 2015 redesign.

Rogers was one of the first cable-system operators in Canada, having secured licences covering much of the then city of Toronto in the late 1960s. One of the first important acquisitions was in 1979, when Ted Rogers purchased a controlling interest in Canadian Cablesystems (CCL), which operated cable companies across Ontario, including the then City of North York, Oshawa/Whitby, London, Kitchener-Waterloo, Cambridge, Brantford, and Newmarket, and joined the CCL properties with his cable interests. In 1980, Rogers purchased Premier Cable, which controlled the system in Vancouver, parts of Ontario, and had investments in Irish cable companies in Dublin, Galway and Waterford. In 1986 Rogers sold their shares of Irish companies to the Irish state broadcaster (RTÉ) and state telecoms company (Eircom); these cable companies are now part of the UPC Ireland network.

In 1981, Rogers entered the U.S. cable market, obtaining franchises in Orange County, California; Minneapolis; and Portland, Oregon, and purchased the cable system in San Antonio. These assets were acquired by Paragon Cable in 1989 for over US$1 billion; Paragon in turn was acquired by Time Warner Cable several years later.

Rogers continued to buy other operators; the largest such acquisition came with Rogers' 1994 acquisition of Maclean-Hunter, at that time also among the largest cable operators. Through its acquisition of Maclean-Hunter, Rogers has also briefly owned cable systems in the United States, which it promptly sold to Comcast in 1994. In March 2000, Rogers agreed to swap systems with Shaw Communications, exchanging its systems in British Columbia for Shaw systems in Quebec and Ontario. The deals gave Rogers and Shaw more consistent service footprints in Eastern and Western Canada respectively.

In 2008, Rogers announced a takeover offer for Aurora Cable, a cable service provider in York Region, Ontario.

On September 9, 2009, Rogers Cable filed a lawsuit in an attempt to prevent Shaw Communications from acquiring Mountain Cablevision of Hamilton, Ontario, on the basis that the two companies had agreed not to encroach on each other's respective territories (Rogers in Eastern Canada, Shaw in Western Canada), and speculated that Shaw would make other acquisitions in Eastern Canada after buying Mountain. Shaw argued that the agreement violated unfair competition laws. The suit was quickly thrown out by the Ontario Superior Court, arguing that the non-compete agreement limited competition, and that Rogers' claims of future harm were "speculative in the extreme". The sale would eventually go through later that year. In January 2013, as part of a larger exchange of assets between the two companies, Shaw pulled out of Hamilton and sold the Mountain Cablevision business to Rogers.

In 2010, a corporate reorganization resulted in Rogers Cable being dissolved as a distinct legal entity, and its operations absorbed into Rogers Communications Partnership, a general partnership jointly held by Rogers Communications and its subsidiary Fido Solutions.

In October 2015, Rogers announced that it would begin to offer 4K-compatible set-top boxes, beginning in Toronto and expanding to its other markets in 2016. Telecasts of 4K sporting events from Sportsnet and TSN began to be carried on these set-top boxes in January 2016.

In December 2016, Rogers announced that it had scrapped a planned project to develop its own IPTV-based television platform, and would instead license Comcast's X1 platform. The new platform, Rogers Ignite TV, launched in August 2018, which includes a "cloud DVR", voice-enabled remote (specifically a Comcast-developed model which won a Technology and Engineering Emmy Award in 2017), and the ability to aggregate linear television and online video content in a single interface. Rogers began to migrate existing digital cable customers to Ignite in October 2019. Rogers announced a deeper technology partnership with Comcast in April 2024, and began rebranding its Ignite products as "Rogers Xfinity" later that year.

== Management ==
- Edward Rogers III - executive chairman of Rogers Communications

== Canadian cable territories ==
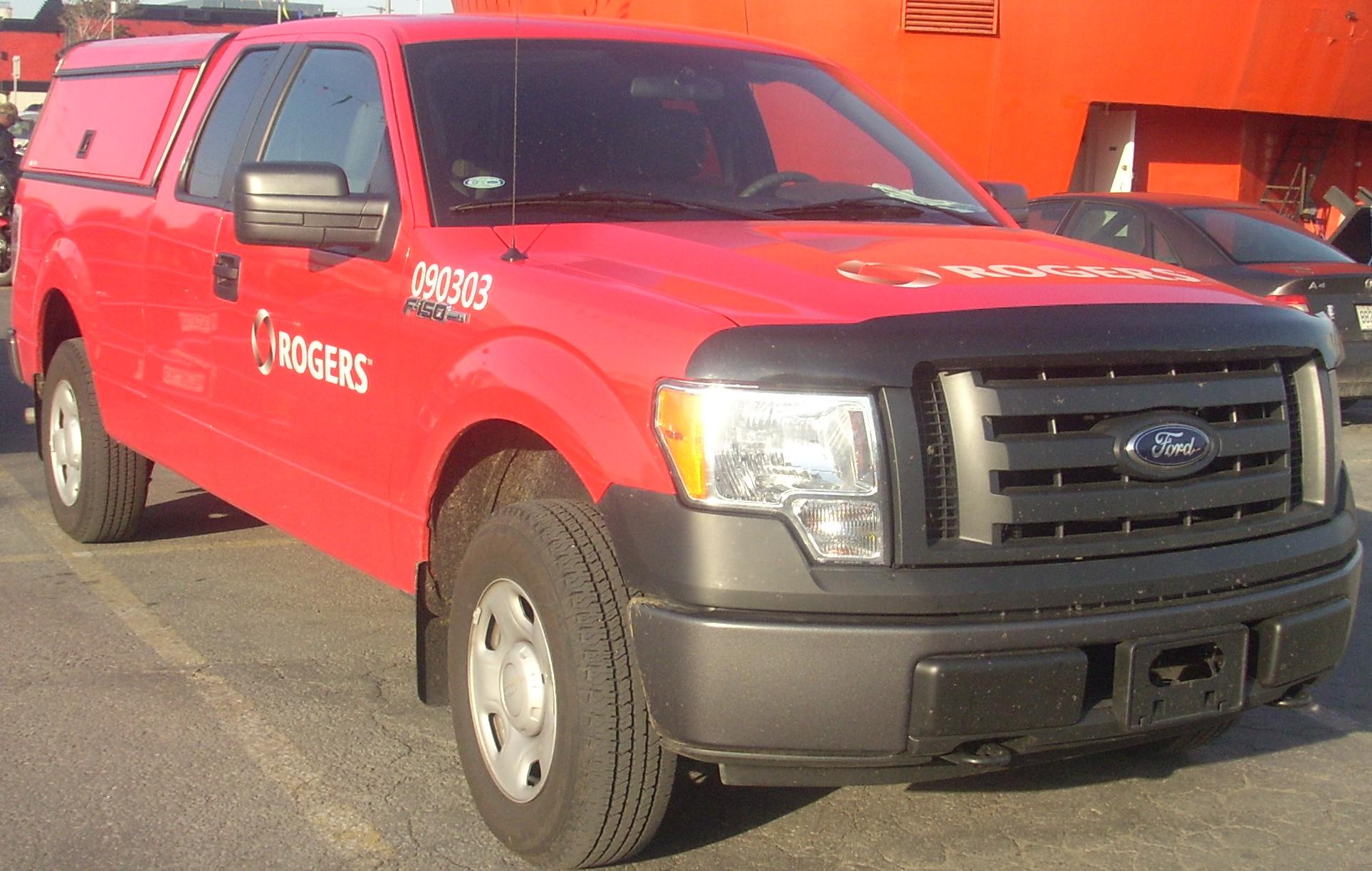
2009 Ford F-150 from Rogers Cable

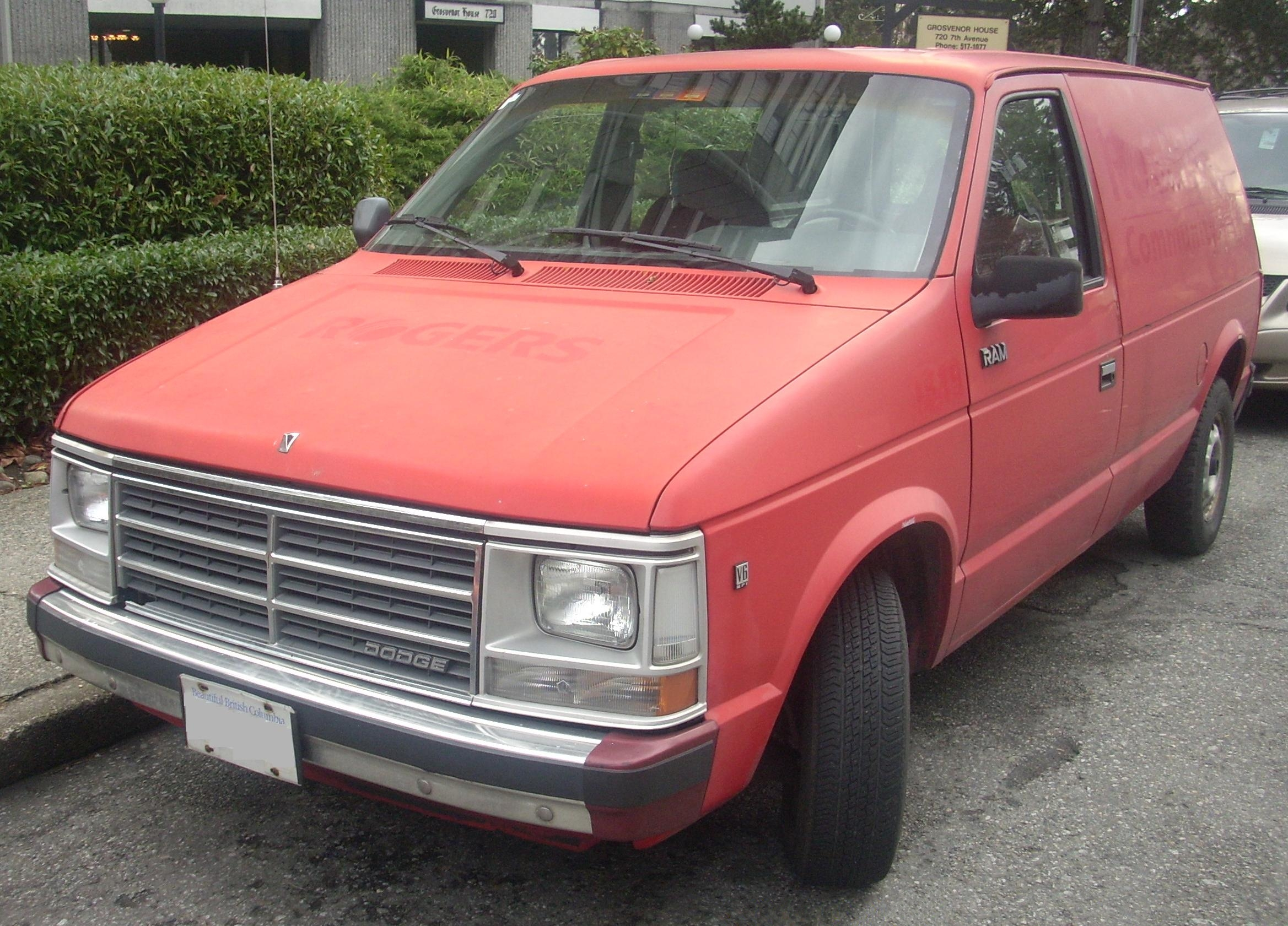
A former Rogers Cable Dodge Ram Caravan from New Westminster, British Columbia. Rogers Cable no longer operates in British Columbia, as Shaw Cable acquired Rogers Cable's Western Canada assets in 2000. The Rogers Cable stickers were removed that year as well.

Rogers Cable currently serves communities in most of Canada, including most larger communities in Newfoundland and Labrador, nearly all of New Brunswick, selected areas of eastern Quebec near the New Brunswick border (including Carleton-sur-Mer), Ontario (including nearly all of the Toronto area as well as the areas of Ottawa, London, Kitchener-Waterloo, York Region, Barrie, and parts of Hamilton), parts of Manitoba (including Winnipeg), parts of Saskatchewan (particularly in Moose Jaw, Prince Albert, Saskatoon, and Swift Current), Alberta, and British Columbia.

Over the years, and at various times, Rogers has owned all or part of various cable operators serving areas across Canada, including Vancouver, Victoria, Calgary, and Northern Ontario. All of the systems in Western Canada were traded to Shaw Communications in late 2000, in exchange for that company's assets in Ontario and New Brunswick, and many of the others were sold to Cogeco. On April 3, 2023, Rogers acquired Shaw, adding its Western Canada portfolio back to the company.

=== Service Areas ===
==== New Brunswick ====
Entered the Province through an asset exchange with Shaw Communications, which had previously acquired Fundy Communications.

Operates in almost every major community, with the exceptions of Sackville and Port Elgin, which are served by EastLink.

==== Newfoundland and Labrador ====
Entered the Province by acquiring Cable Atlantic.

- St. John's
- Conception Bay South
- Paradise
- Mount Pearl
- Corner Brook
- Grand Falls-Windsor
- Gander
- Portugal Cove-St. Philip's
- Torbay
- Deer Lake
- Channel-Port aux Basques
- Pasadena
- Bishop's Falls
- Botwood
- Logy Bay-Middle Cove-Outer Cove
- Pouch Cove
- New-Wes-Valley
- Wabana
- Flatrock
- Witless Bay
- Massey Drive
- Bay Bulls
- Petty Harbour-Maddox Cove
- Musgrave Harbour
- Carmanville
- Peterview
- Mount Moriah
- Isle-Aux-Morts
- Burnt Islands
- Bauline
- Rose Blanche-Harbour Le Cou
- Little Rapids
- Humber Village

==== Ontario ====
Large acquisitions: cable operations of Famous Players (Canadian Cablesystems) and Maclean-Hunter.

- Barrie
- Durham Region (acquisition of Compton Communications)
- Guelph
- Hamilton (acquisition of Source Cable) and Mountain Cablevision
- Kincardine (acquisition of Kincardine Cable)
- London
- Ottawa
- Waterloo Region
- York Region (acquisition of Aurora Cable Internet)

==== Quebec ====
- Carleton-sur-Mer and surrounding areas (community close to New Brunswick border)

=== Community channels ===
- Rogers TV (English)
- TV Rogers (French)

== Other investments ==
=== CPAC ===
Through Rogers Cable, Rogers is the largest shareholder (41.4%) in CPAC, a national public affairs and politics cable channel based in Ottawa, that consists of both an English- and a French-language feed. CPAC's main programming consists of live and delayed coverage of the House of Commons and the Senate.

=== Retail stores ===
Rogers Cable previously operated a chain of video rental stores known as Rogers Plus; it launched as Rogers Video in 1988, after which it grew by acquiring smaller chains. The Rogers Video chain and Rogers Wireless retail stores were merged into a single chain known as Rogers Plus in 2007. After 23 years in business, Rogers Plus discontinued movie and game rentals in 2012, and the chain's remaining locations were re-tooled as Rogers stores for selling the company's services.

== Criticism ==
=== Negative option billing ===
In the beginning of 1995, Rogers along with several other cable companies, added a number of new cable channels under a negative option billing plan. Subscribers opting out of paying for the new channels stood to lose much of their existing specialty channel programming. The participating cable companies were hit by both regulatory and public opinion backlash and ultimately were forced to split the negative-option channels into two separately purchasable blocks, a move which Rogers had initially opposed as "not technologically feasible".

=== Dropping of WPBS and WQLN ===
In July 2009, Rogers Cable announced that on August 18, 2009, they would be replacing PBS affiliates WQLN of Erie, Pennsylvania and WPBS-TV of Watertown, New York on its London and Ottawa systems, respectively, with Detroit, Michigan's PBS station, WTVS. A representative for Rogers said that they were replacing WQLN and WPBS with WTVS, because viewers wanted "a feed that has a higher-quality reception." WQLN and WPBS, however, had shown great concern for Rogers' move, as these are the largest cities in the stations' respective coverage areas and much of their pledges come from Rogers viewers. In addition, both stations first heard of the discontinuance not through Rogers, but through their loyal viewers.

On July 30, 2009, it was announced that Rogers would keep WPBS and WQLN on its systems, after both stations announced a fibre-based connection with Rogers. Additional funds will be allocated to complete the transition; while WQLN announced that they will spend $55,000 to provide a connection, WPBS agreed with Rogers not to disclose the cost of the fibre-optic signal for their own station.

=== Software issues ===
The introduction of Rogers' "Navigatr" user interface in mid-2015 was heavily criticized by users for being poorly designed and harder to use. Rogers began to address these issues with a new version it began to deploy in December 2015.

On May 6, 2016, Rogers was criticized when a nightly 2:00 a.m. reboot of NextBox set-top boxes caused viewers to miss the conclusion of an NHL playoff game between the Nashville Predators and San Jose Sharks, which had gone to triple overtime. The broadcast was, ironically, being carried by Rogers-owned network Sportsnet 360, prompting The Globe and Mail to compare the incident to the Heidi game. A Rogers spokesperson apologized for the incident and stated that they were investigating the issue, as the reboot was not supposed to occur while watching live programming.
