= List of internet service providers in Canada =

This is an alphabetical list of notable internet service providers in Canada.

Among Canada's biggest internet service providers (ISP) are Bell, Rogers, Telus, and Shaw—with the former two being the largest in Ontario, and the latter two dominating western provinces.

== List ==
| Service provider | Internet connection type(s) | Region(s) served | Parent/owner | Notes |
|---|---|---|---|---|
| Access Communications | | Saskatchewan | | |
| Aurora Cable Internet | Cable Internet | | Rogers Communications | Acquired by Rogers Communications in 2008. |
| Avetria Networks | | Ontario | | |
| Bell Aliant | | Atlantic Canada | Bell Canada | |
| Bell Internet | | | Bell Canada | |
| Bell MTS | | Manitoba | Bell Canada | |
| Cable Axion | Cable Internet | Estrie, Montérégie, Beauce, Bellechasse, Les Etchemins, and Lotbinière, QC | Cogeco | |
| Cablevision du Nord | Cable Internet | Northern Quebec | Bell Canada | |
| Chebucto Community Net | | Halifax Regional Municipality, NS | Chebucto Community Net Society | |
| CIK Telecom | | Ontario; Quebec; Alberta; British Columbia; Saskatchewan; Manitoba | | |
| Cogeco | Cable Internet | Ontario; Quebec | | |
| Dery Telecom | Cable Internet | Quebec | Cogeco | |
| Distributel | | | Bell Canada | Acquired by Bell Canada, September 2022 |
| Eastlink | | Atlantic Canada | | |
| EBOX | | Ontario; Quebec | Bell Canada | Acquired by Bell Canada, February 2022 |
| Everus Communications | | | | |
| Execulink Telecom | | | | |
| Fido | | | Rogers Communications | Fido no longer offers home internet plans (Dec 2023). Current customers are being migrated to the parent company Rogers Communications. |
| Koodo | Cable Internet | Saskatchewan; Manitoba; Ontario; Quebec; Prince Edward Island; Nova Scotia; New Brunswick; Newfoundland and Labrador | Telus | |
| MNSi Telecom | | Southern Ontario | | |
| National Capital FreeNet | | Ottawa | | |
| NorthernTel | | Northern Ontario | Bell Aliant | |
| Northwestel | | Northern Canada | Bell Canada | |
| Novus Entertainment | | | | |
| Ontera | | Northern Ontario | Bell Aliant | |
| Oxio | | | Cogeco Connexion | |
| Primus Canada | | Canada | Distributel | Bell Canada owns Distributel. |
| Project Chapleau | | Chapleau, Ontario | | |
| Qiniq | | Nunavut | SSI Micro Ltd. | |
| Rally Internet | | Ontario, Alberta, British Columbia | Rally Enterprises & Communications Corp. | |
| Rogers Hi-Speed Internet | Cable Internet | | Rogers Communications | |
| SaskTel | | Saskatchewan | | |
| Seaside Communications | | Nova Scotia | Rogers Communications | Rogers Communications |
| Shaw | Cable Internet | | Rogers Communications | Acquired by Rogers Communications, April 2023 |
| Source Cable | Cable Internet | | Rogers Communications | |
| SSI Micro | | Northern Canada | Netcrawler | |
| Tbaytel | | Thunder Bay, ON, and surrounding area | City of Thunder Bay | |
| TekSavvy | | | Marc Gaudrault | |
| Telebec | | | Bell Canada | |
| Telesat | Satellite Internet | Low Earth orbit | Telesat | |
| Telus Internet | | Ontario; Quebec; Manitoba; Saskatchewan; Alberta; British Columbia | Telus | |
| Vancouver Community Network | | Vancouver, BC | | |
| Vidéotron | Cable Internet | Quebec; New Brunswick; some parts of Eastern Ontario | Quebecor | |
| Virgin Plus | | | Bell Canada | |
| VMedia | | Ontario; Quebec; Manitoba; Saskatchewan; Alberta; British Columbia | Quebecor | |
| Wireless Nomad | | | | |
| Xplore Inc | | | | A rural fixed wireless broadband service provider |
| Starlink | Satellite Internet | Low Earth orbit | SpaceX | A rural Satellite Internet service provider |

== Former ISPs ==
- Craig Wireless
- Internex Online
- Look Communications
- Mountain Cablevision
- Persona Communications — acquired by Eastlink
- Rush Communications Ltd.

== See also ==
- Internet in Canada
- Telecommunications in Canada
- List of companies of Canada
