= Benoît Laliberté =

Canadian tech entrepreneur and inventor

Benoit Laliberté
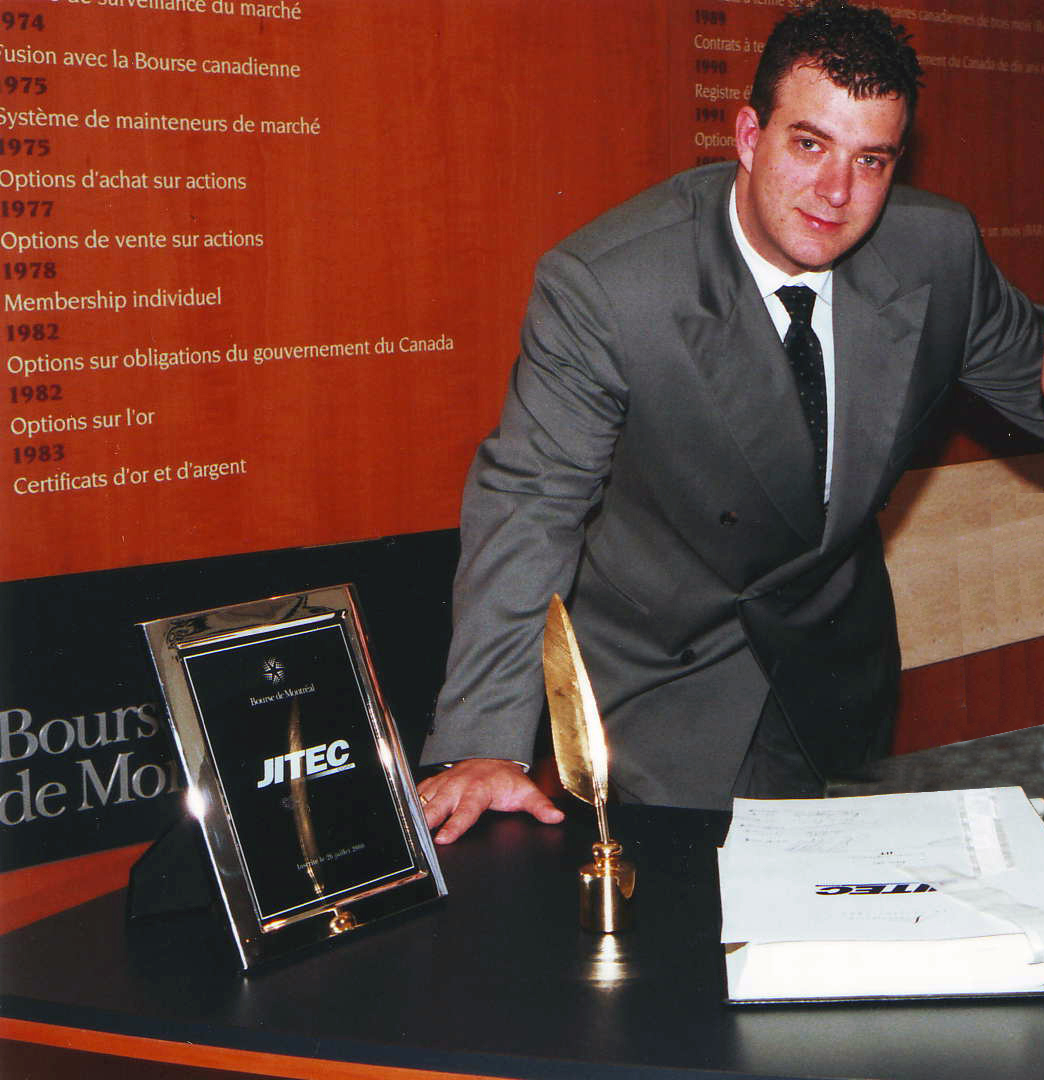
- circa 2000
- Born: Benoit Laliberté; July 18, 1972 (age 54); Mont-Saint-Hilaire, Quebec, Canada
- Occupation: Entrepreneur
- Title: CEO of Investel Capital and UnitedCorp
- Spouse: Nathalie Poudrier (m. 1998; div. 2005)
- Partner: Anne-Marie Poudrier 2006 – 2012
- Children: 4 (6)
- Website: www.benoitlaliberte.com

Benoît Laliberté (born July 18, 1972) is a Canadian entrepreneur, inventor and is currently the CEO of Investel Capital Corporation and United American Corp. He is the founder of JITEC, Vectoria Inc., TeliPhone Corp., the New York Telecom Exchange Inc and Teliphone Navigata-Westel. Laliberté’s personal net worth was estimated at more than C$345 million. In 2016, Laliberté’s iFramed patent portfolio was appraised at approximately US$1 billion by TechInsights, a Silicon Valley patent analysis firm.

Earlier in his career, Laliberté gained some notoriety in Canada and in Quebec with JITEC. In July 2000, JITEC was listed on the Montreal Exchange following an initial public offering during the height of the technology market expansion a public company which at its peak in 2000 had an estimated value of $CDN575 million. In a 2000 interview, Benoit Laliberte stated that JITEC was “provoking a revolution in the way people do computing,” At a time when the term “cloud computing” had not yet entered mainstream use, JITEC’s approach anticipated what would later become widely known as cloud-based infrastructure and managed services. The company’s early emphasis on remote management, shared resources, and subscription-style access positioned it as a precursor to the cloud computing model that would emerge in the following decade.

In later years, Laliberté became involved in telecommunications ventures and patent development through Investel Capital Corporation. In 2016, Investel filed patent litigation against Snapchat in United States district court of Los Angeles and in Federal Court of Canada relating to Geofence geofiltering technology. More recently, he invented several technologies in telecommunications, social media, and information technology (IT).

== Early years and beginnings (1986–1993) ==
Benoît Laliberté was born in Mont-Saint-Hilaire, Québec, Canada. Laliberté founded JITEC while still young, initially building computer systems for local customers before incorporating the company in 1992.He was described in the 1990s as an early technology entrepreneur who began assembling computer systems in his teens. He started his business in 1986 at the age of fourteen, building computer systems in his basement for friends and family. He dropped out of college to work full-time on JITEC. After working at JITEC for several years as sole proprietorship, he incorporated the company in 1992 and began to sell computers, software and related components in Canada.By the mid-1990s, JITEC had expanded into hardware distribution, systems integration, and enterprise IT services.

== JITEC and technology claims (1994–1999) ==
In April 1994, JITEC announced what it described as a “virus-immune” computer system incorporating its Electronic Virus Activity Control (EVAC) technology. The company claimed the system could detect and prevent computer virus activity in real time. However, technical specialists expressed skepticism regarding the breadth of such claims. Vectoria computer announced that it would stop using Intel’s Pentium processor and instead adopt the California-made NexGen Nx586 RISC microprocessor (Reduced Instruction Set Computer), which it described as faster and more efficient.

In 1994, Laliberté created Vectoria Inc., a portfolio of companies involved in software, information technology, and telecommunications. In conjunction with Vectoria, JITEC created the first electronic virus immune computer using its Electronic Virus Activity Control (EVAC) technology. EVAC was built into computer servers to immediately detect and prevent viruses. By 1996, JITEC had CDN$7 million in annual sales and 45 employees. This led to him winning the Young Entrepreneur of the Year award by the Business Development Bank of Canada (BDC).

In 1997, Laliberté created Windows Based Intelligent Terminals (WINBIT) and POWERVEC servers. He worked with Microsoft to develop the first generation of cloud computing services. In July 2000, JITEC was listed on the Montreal Stock Exchange after a successful IPO. At this point, Laliberté's personal net worth was in excess of $345 million.

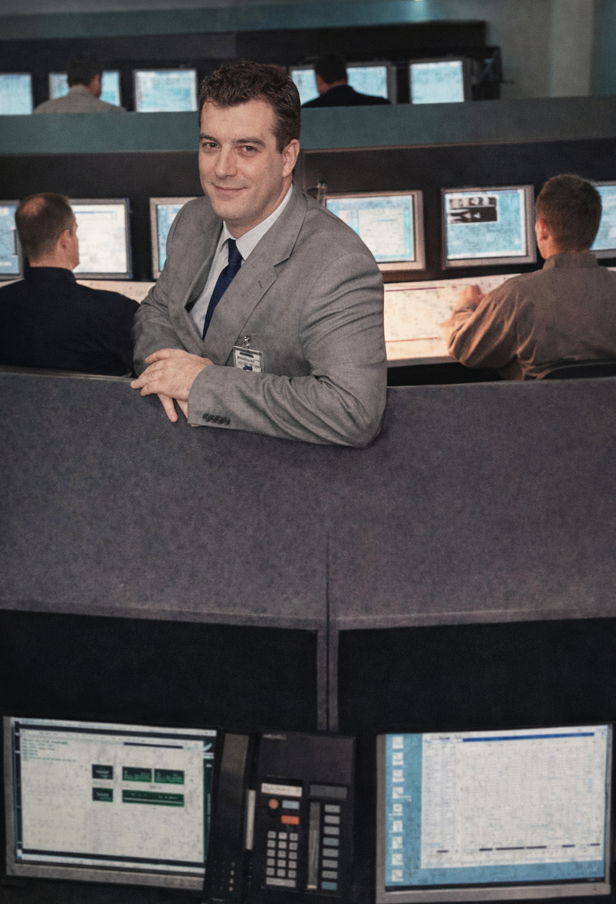
Benoit Laliberte in control Center

== JITEC IPO ==
In early 2000, JITEC announced plans to go public on the Montreal Exchange. In March 2000, the company was seeking capital to finance expansion into international markets. The IPO was completed in July 2000, with strong investor interest during the technology boom. At the height of its stock-market rise, JITEC reached a market value of approximately C$700 million.

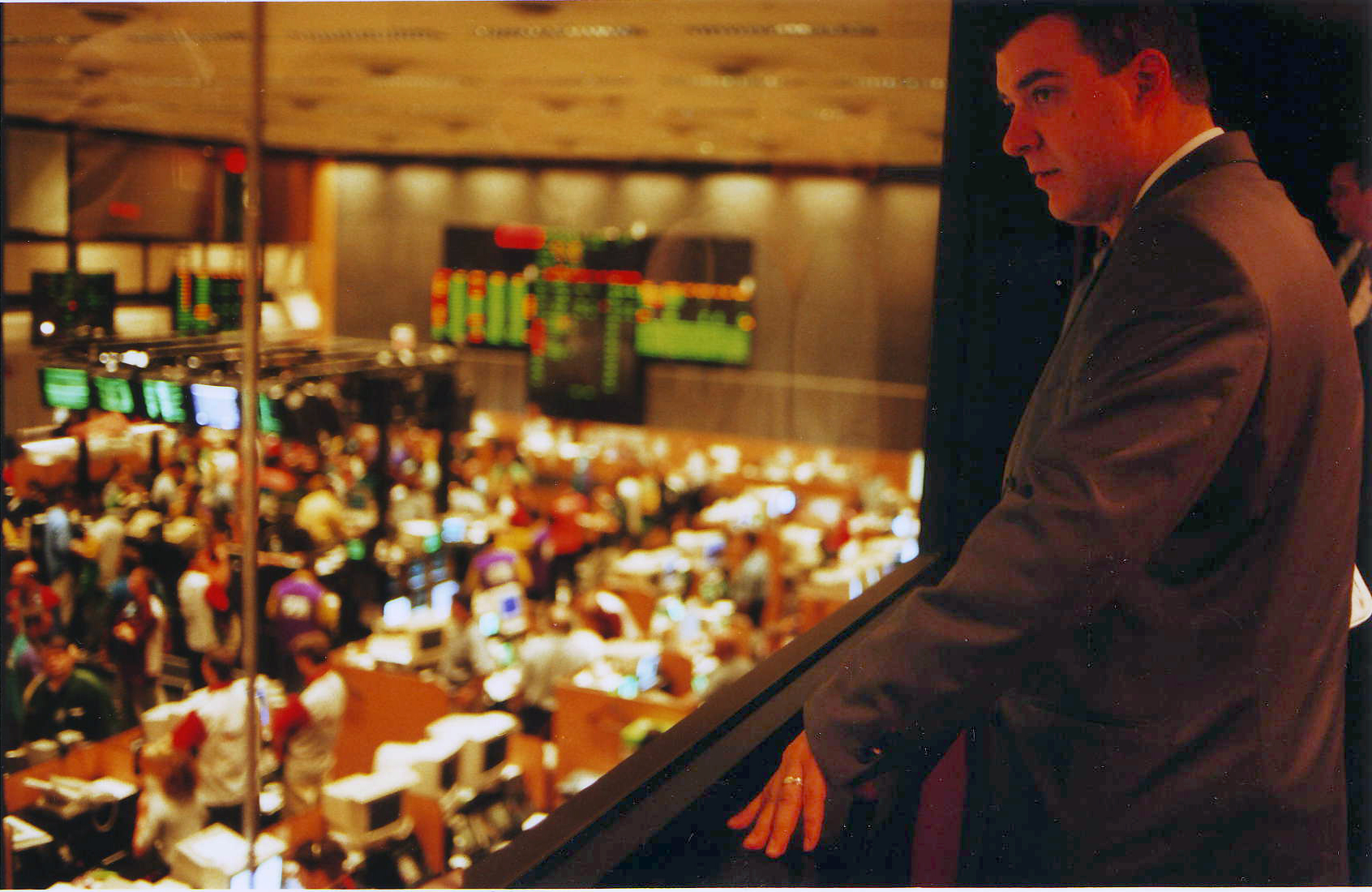
July 2000: Benoit Laliberté at The Montreal Stock Exchange on JITEC's first day of trading.

=== Leadership style and public profile ===
Media profiles in the 1990s described Laliberté as a young technology entrepreneur whose public image was built around early technical experience, risk-taking, and rapid business growth. By 1996, he was described as the sole owner of JITEC, operating company-owned stores and franchises, selling Vectoria computers, and supplying computer, software, networking, and maintenance services to small businesses. In 2000, JITEC’s leadership profile was associated with ambitious expansion targets, including plans to triple revenues, hire approximately 240 workers, and expand its network-computing services. The company’s public-market story also emphasized its thin-client/network-computing model for small and medium-sized businesses, which was presented as a lower-cost alternative to conventional Personal computer ownership.

After JITEC’s public listing, Laliberté’s profile became tied to the company’s share-price volatility, market speculation, and regulatory scrutiny. During this period, coverage also focused on short (finance) (short selling), personal trading, disclosure issues, and the difficulty of managing a newly public company. Laliberté defended JITEC’s management and business fundamentals, saying the company had a product, a business plan, and significant employee growth after going public. In 2000, Laliberté received attention for traveling to work by his helicopter during the same period in which JITEC was under scrutiny as a newly public company and said the door-to-door trip from his home in Mont-Saint-Hilaire took about six minutes.

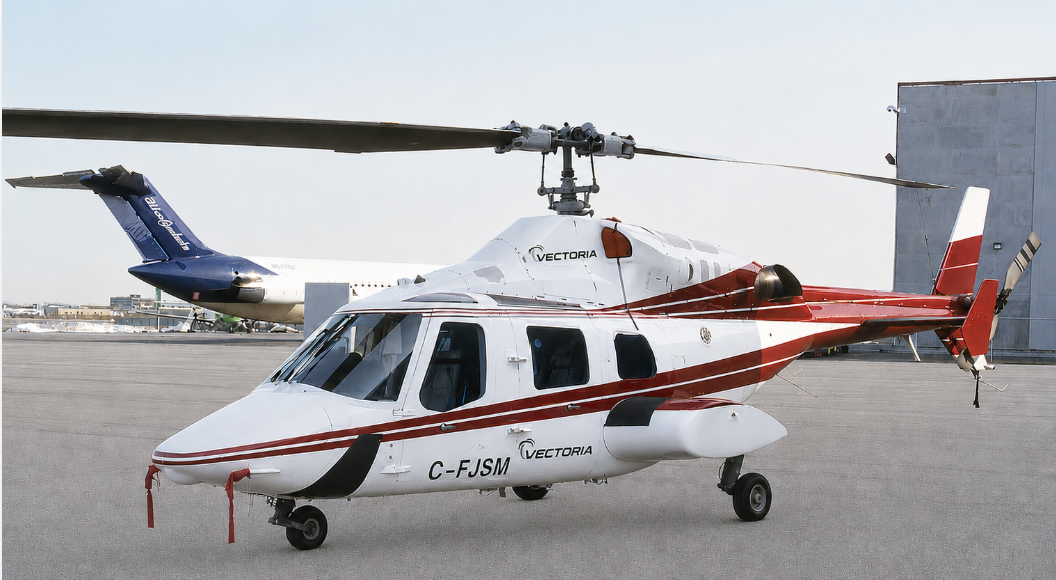
Laliberté personal aircraft at Pierre-Elliott Trudeau airport Montreal

=== Regulatory and market controversy ===
In October 2000, JITEC became the subject of scrutiny by the Quebec Securities Commission (QSC; French: Commission des valeurs mobilières du Québec, CVMQ), following questions regarding trading activity in the company’s shares. JITEC’s stock experienced sharp volatility in the weeks following its market debut, drawing attention from regulators and investors. On October 13, 2000, the QSC was investigating trading in JITEC shares amid concerns about irregular transactions. In mid-October, trading in JITEC shares was temporarily halted as the Montreal Exchange requested clarification regarding corporate announcements. During this period, attention turned to a dispute between Benoit Laliberté and Montreal businessman Herbert Black, chief executive of American Iron & Metal.

On October 14, 2000, a clash between Laliberté and Black was described as scrutiny increased around JITEC’s public disclosures and market activity. Laliberté had met with short sellers and the company was facing growing pressure from market critics. In August and September 2000, speculation surrounding major contracts contributed to rapid shifts in JITEC’s stock price.

=== Trading ban and leadership crisis ===
On November 11, 2000, the QSC issued a personal trading ban preventing Laliberté from trading JITEC shares. The same day, Laliberté was accused by regulators of supporting trading activity in his own stock. The president of JITEC had been prohibited from securities transactions during the investigation. On November 13, 2000, Laliberté stepped aside temporarily as chief executive officer while the probe continued. The following day, the head of the company had stepped down amid mounting controversy. On November 23, 2000, Laliberté resigned as the scandal deepened. The company sought a replacement for Laliberté as regulators and shareholders intensified scrutiny. That same day, Laliberté resigned as president of JITEC.

=== Shareholder litigation and public fallout ===
In November 2000, investors were considering legal action related to losses incurred during the stock’s decline. A class action petition was filed naming Laliberté and financial intermediaries including CIBC Capital Markets and Canaccord Genuity. Laliberté was named in a lawsuit related to the drop in share price. Herbert Black had initiated legal proceedings while also being a prominent figure in the unfolding dispute. In late November, PricewaterhouseCoopers (PwC) had conducted a technology study questioning aspects of JITEC’s marketing and assets.

=== Company restructuring and transition ===
Following Laliberté’s resignation, JITEC appointed new leadership and adjusted its board structure. In December 2000, JITEC named a new chief executive officer and continued efforts to stabilize operations. In 2001, JITEC later adopted the name Advantage Link Inc., a move widely interpreted as an attempt to reminder the company’s identity amid the fallout of the regulatory scandal.

== Herbert Black and QSC controversy (2000–2005) ==
Herbert Black became a recurring figure in coverage of the JITEC troubles after he complained to the QSC about suspected irregular trading in the company’s shares. Black, the chief executive of American Iron & Metal, was described as having provided information to regulators after meeting Laliberté at a Montreal restaurant in September 2000. Former QSC enforcement official Jean Lorrain later testified that Black put pressure on the commission to halt trading in JITEC stock and was treated as an informant. At the time of Black’s complaint, staff at the commission were not initially aware that he had a short position in JITEC.

Black acknowledged that he had sold JITEC shares short, while maintaining that he did so only after telling the commission and newspapers what he knew. Laliberté alleged that Black had shorted the stock before reporting his concerns to regulators, an allegation Black disputed. It was also reported that Black had not been accused of an offence in connection with the matters described. Subsequent reporting described questions inside the regulator about Black’s motives after his short position became known. Lorrain was reported as having characterized Black as a “white knight” figure who acted as a market informant while also profiting personally from scandals in which he became involved.

The controversy later focused on Paul Trudeau, a QSC investigator assigned to the JITEC file, who acknowledged receiving $1,000 from Black in December 2000. Trudeau said the money was a gift and that he had not provided a service to Black in exchange for it, while Laliberté’s litigation alleged that Trudeau had leaked confidential material. The dispute led to internal disciplinary and labour proceedings after Trudeau’s dismissal, and in 2003 the QSC agreed to continue paying him while keeping him away from the office.

Catherine Gagnon, a former QSC lawyer, was reported as having brought the payment to management’s attention after leaving the regulator. Her sworn statements were reported as saying that she had delayed disclosure because Trudeau knew of her relationship with then-premier Bernard Landry and because she feared Black’s reaction. The episode became part of broader debate about the regulator’s handling of the JITEC matter and later formed part of Laliberté’s damages claim against the QSC. Another senior investigator, Laurent Lemieux, was also reported as having been dismissed after allegations that he leaked confidential investigation information to journalists.

== Corporate restructuring and Advantage Link (2001–2002) ==
Following the resignation of Benoit Laliberté, JITEC undertook restructuring efforts and leadership changes as regulators continued their investigation. In early 2001, Laliberté remained involved with the company as a consultant after stepping down as chief executive. In January 2001, securities authorities lifted certain restrictions, allowing Laliberté to trade JITEC shares again under specified conditions. In June 2001, shareholders were asked to vote on the company’s future direction as trading resumed after a prolonged halt. By 2001, the company adopted the name Advantage Link Inc., a rebranding widely interpreted as an attempt to distance itself from the JITEC controversy. In August 2001, former Quebec cabinet minister André Vallerand was appointed chairman of Advantage Link’s board of directors. During this period, Paul Massicotte, president of Groupe Alexis Nihon and later a Canadian senator at the Senate of Canada, served as chairman of the board during the crisis years. The company also recruited Alex Delisle, a former senior executive at Hewlett-Packard, as chief executive officer in an effort to stabilize operations. Denis Durand, associated with Stephen A. Jarislowsky’s investment firm, Jarislowsky Fraser, also served on the company’s board during its restructuring efforts.

=== Financial distress and investor concerns ===
Throughout 2001, concerns continued about Advantage Link’s financial position, including questions about receivables and cash reserves. In March 2001, JITEC’s cash position was under pressure and certain amounts were considered potentially uncollectable. Laliberté also faced allegations of defaulting on debts connected to the company’s finances. In May 2001, securities investigations cleared Laliberté of certain wrongdoing allegations in relation to early trading activity. However, the company’s shares continued to face volatility as the broader technology boom collapsed. The entire affair has been widely reported in Canadian media. On September 23, 2013, the Montreal newspaper La Presse published an article on Laliberté, which chronicled his business life since 2000.

=== Class actions and civil proceedings (2002) ===
By 2002, shareholder litigation expanded, with courts authorizing proceedings related to alleged stock losses. In September 2002, a Quebec judge approved a lawsuit over stock losses involving JITEC and related defendants. Several brokers and financial intermediaries were questioned in court proceedings connected to the proposed class action. The petition named firms including CIBC Capital Markets and Canaccord Genuity as part of the broader litigation. During the same period, defense counsel argued financier Herbert Black played a central role in encouraging the class action effort.

In October 2014 the case was settled for 9.85 million. A court-appointed claims administrator is currently in the process of dealing with all claims in the matter.

=== Lawsuits against brokers and securities regulator (2003) ===
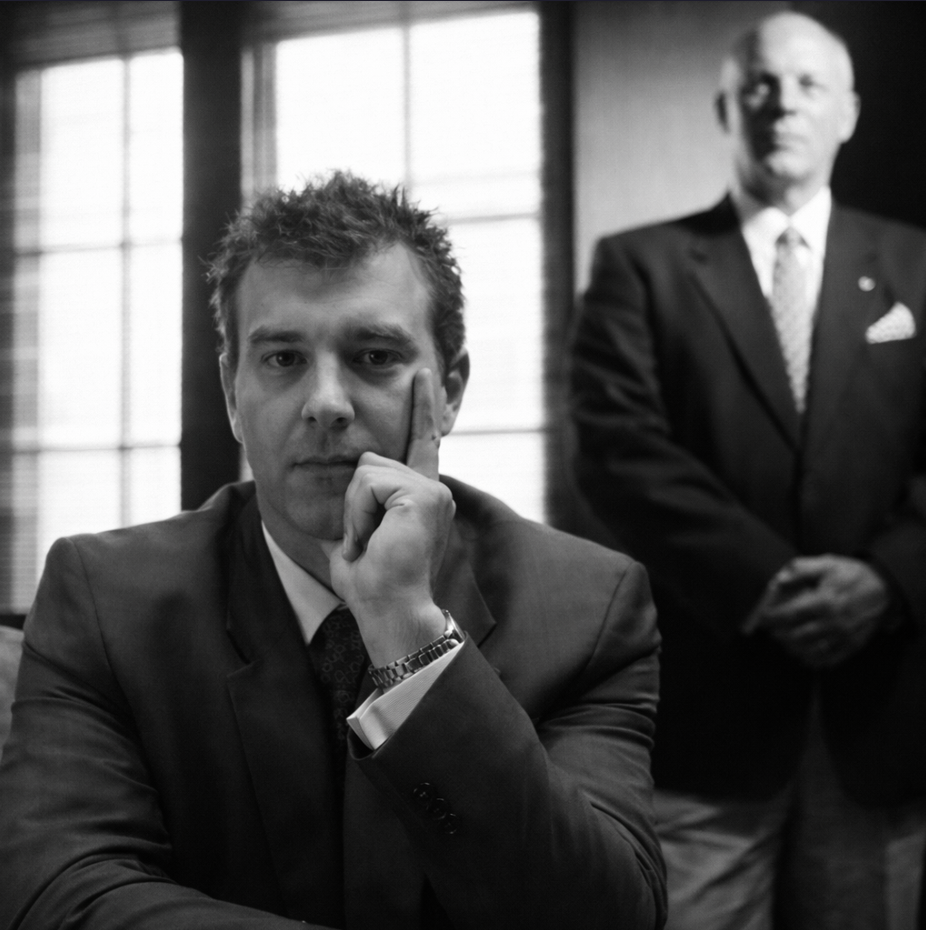
Benoit Laliberte with Reevin Pearl Lawyer

In October 2003, Laliberté filed a civil lawsuit against brokerage firm Canaccord Genuity seeking damages related to transactions during the JITEC period. In November 2003, Laliberté launched a major lawsuit against the QSC, alleging abusive and reckless conduct during the investigation. The action was described as a $117-million claim against the regulator, one of the largest suits of its kind filed in Quebec securities history. Laliberté sought damages exceeding $100 million in relation to the collapse of JITEC’s market value.

== Transition to AMF enforcement (2004) ==
In 2004, the Autorité des marchés financiers (Quebec) (AMF) replaced the QSC as Quebec’s securities regulator and continued enforcement actions arising from the JITEC matter. In October 2004, the AMF pursued statute proceedings against Laliberté, seeking substantial financial penalties. Laliberté could face sanctions of up to $1 million under Quebec securities law.

=== AMF Provincial Statute Proceedings (2004–2008) ===
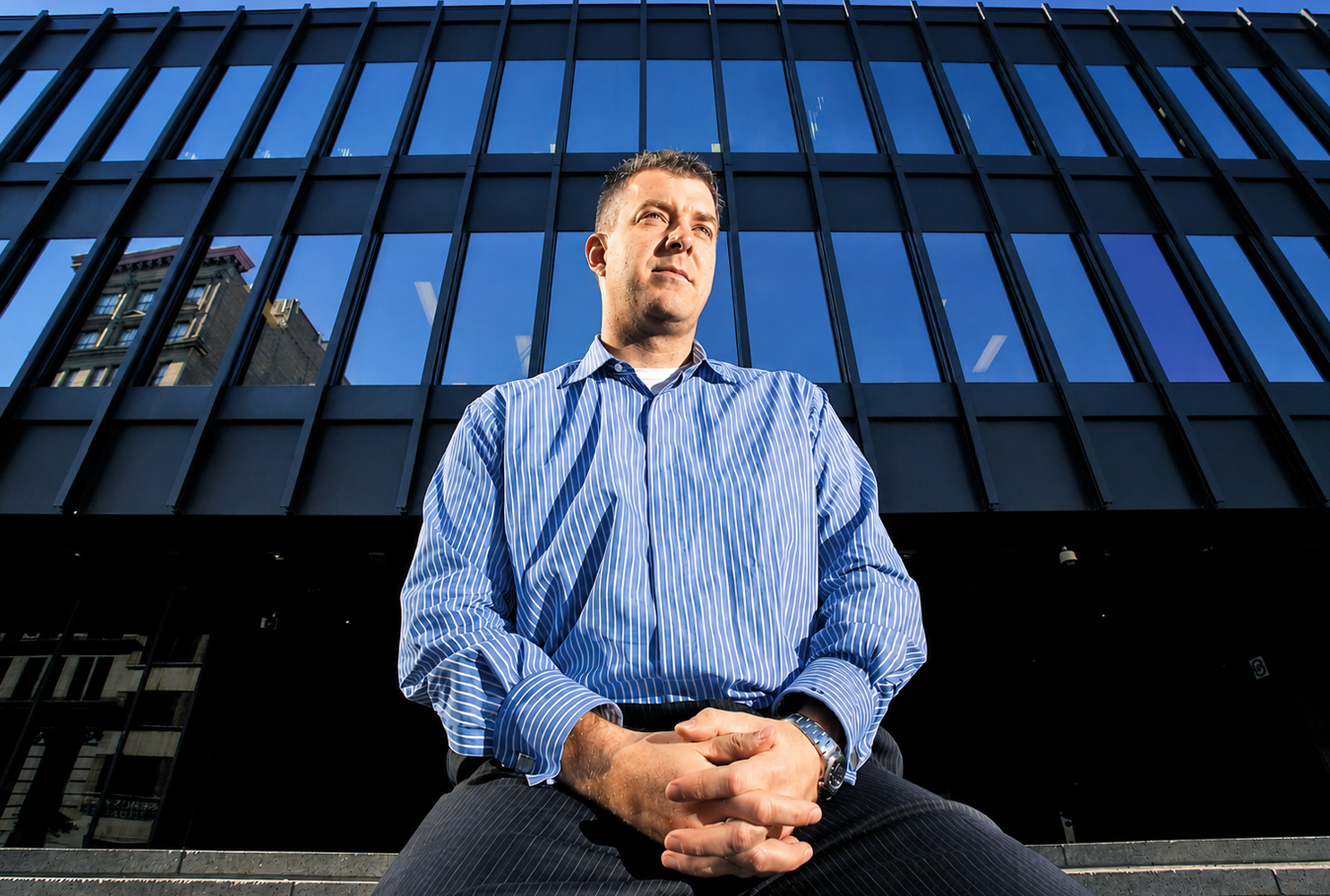
Benoit Laliberte in front Montreal Court House

Following the initiation of statute proceedings by the Autorité des marchés financiers (Quebec) (AMF) in 2004, formal charges alleging violations of Quebec securities legislation proceeded through the courts. In 2007, Laliberté’s trial opened, focusing on allegations that certain public disclosures and trading-related communications during the JITEC period were misleading. Prosecutors alleged Laliberté had promoted contracts and commercial arrangements that regulators argued did not materialize as publicly presented. Testimony related to corporate announcements issued during the rapid rise of JITEC’s stock price in 2000. In November 2007, courtroom exchanges included Laliberté denying wrongdoing and attributing the collapse of the company’s share price in part to external market pressures and actions by critics. On February 22, 2008, Laliberté was found guilty on multiple securities-related counts. The court concluded that certain public statements made during the 2000 period constituted violations of Quebec securities law. The verdict was described as one of the most prominent securities convictions arising from Quebec’s technology boom era. In August 2008, Laliberté was fined approximately C$900,000 in connection with the convictions. The AMF had initially sought penalties totaling approximately C$1.2 million. In May 2009, Laliberté was found guilty on three additional counts connected to the JITEC matter. The proceedings extended over several years and involved numerous counts relating to securities infractions. He was found guilty of stock market manipulation in 2008.In September 2010, a court ordered Laliberté to pay increased financial penalties as part of enforcement actions arising from the convictions.

=== Appeals and Supreme Court decision (2010–2011) ===
Laliberté appealed aspects of the convictions and penalties. In 2011, the Supreme Court of Canada declined to hear a further appeal, effectively leaving the lower court rulings in place. The refusal to grant leave to appeal marked the conclusion of the principal criminal proceedings arising from the JITEC investigation.

== Other Ventures ==
=== TeliPhone Corp. and Teliphone Navigata-Westel telecommunications expansion ===
Following the JITEC proceedings, Laliberté became involved in telecommunications ventures, including the founding of TeliPhone Corp. in 2004. TeliPhone was described as an Voice over Internet Protocol telecommunications provider offering hosted business telephony and IP-based services. In December 2012, TeliPhone acquired Vancouver-based Navigata Communications 2009 Inc., forming what was later referred to as TeliPhone Navigata-Westel. The acquisition expanded the company’s footprint in Western Canada’s voice and data markets. In August 2014, Laliberté announced that he was stepping away from operational leadership roles following restructuring efforts within the company. In November 2016, 8640025 Canada Inc., doing business as Teliphone Navigata-Westel Communications, filed for court protection under the Companies' Creditors Arrangement Act in the Supreme Court of British Columbia, and Ernst & Young was appointed as monitor and directed to manage the business. On September 28, 2017, the monitor closed an agreement under which Distributel acquired the assets of TNW and took over associated operations. In September 2022, Bell Canada announced that Distributel would join the Bell group of companies along with TNW operations to support Bell's growth strategy in residential and business Internet services in Canada. BCE later reported that the proposed acquisition of Distributel was valued at up to C$335 million, based on the achievement of certain performance objectives.

=== New York Telecom Exchange (NYTEX) ===
Laliberté was associated with the New York Telecom Exchange (NYTEX), a company described as a telecommunications commodity exchange. In 2012, Teliphone acquired New York Telecom Exchange from United America Corp.

=== TNW Wireless ===
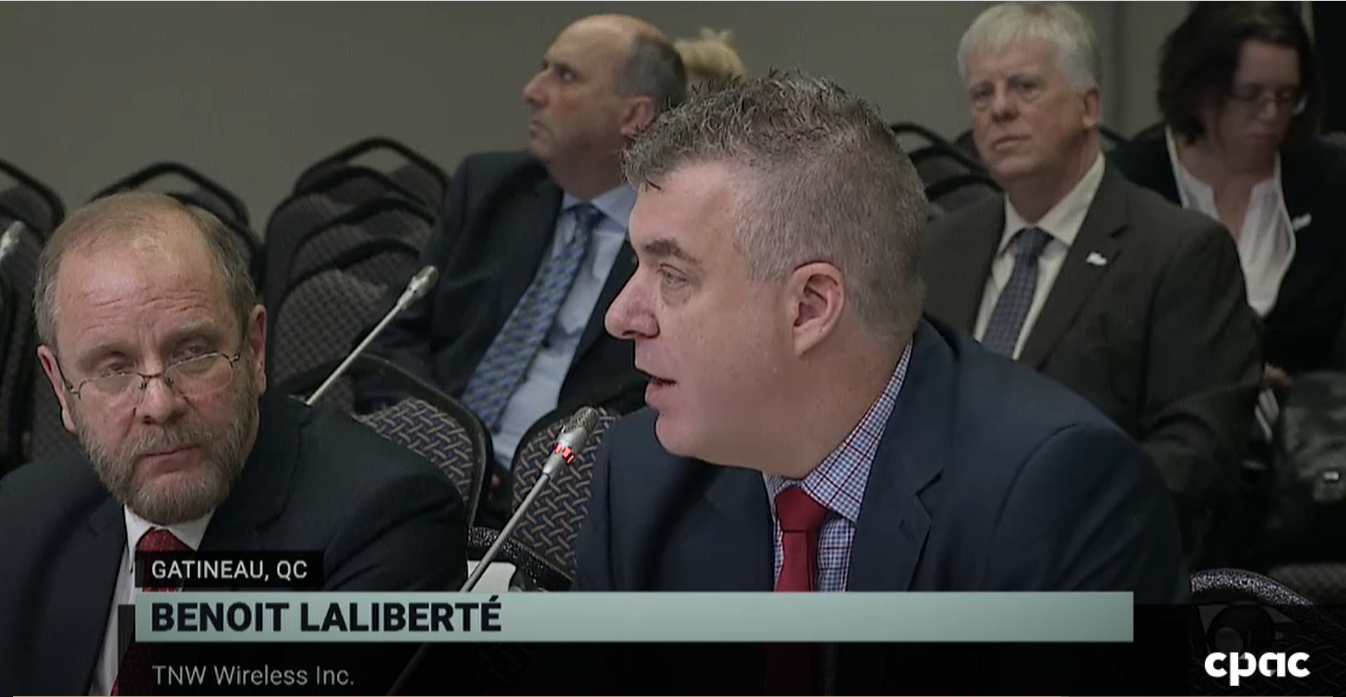
Benoit Laliberte at Canadian Radio-television and Telecommunications Commission (CRTC)

In 2017, TNW Wireless Inc., a company controlled by Investel Capital Corporation and previously known as RuralCom Corporation, applied to the Canadian Radio-television and Telecommunications Commission (CRTC) for mandated wholesale mobile wireless roaming agreements from Bell Mobility Inc. and TELUS Communications Inc. pursuant to the Commission’s wholesale wireless framework. TNW indicated that it intended to operate as a facilities-based wireless carrier and proposed to offer two services: a traditional mobile wireless service and an Internet Personal Communications System (iPCS), described as a Wi-Fi-based smartphone-over-IP service. In Telecom Decision CRTC 2019-56, issued 28 February 2019, the Commission determined that TNW had demonstrated ownership of spectrum licences transferred from RuralCom and operation of a core network and radio access network (RAN) in British Columbia and Yukon.

=== HouseBit ===
HouseBit is a real estate technology platform that facilitates the tokenisation of residential properties through blockchain-based digital tokens. The company structures properties through trusts that are divided into 1,000 digital units offered to the public, along with a separate occupancy token granting usage rights. The platform was profiled in 2024 as part of broader analysis of blockchain-based property investment models.

=== Bitcoin mining operations ===
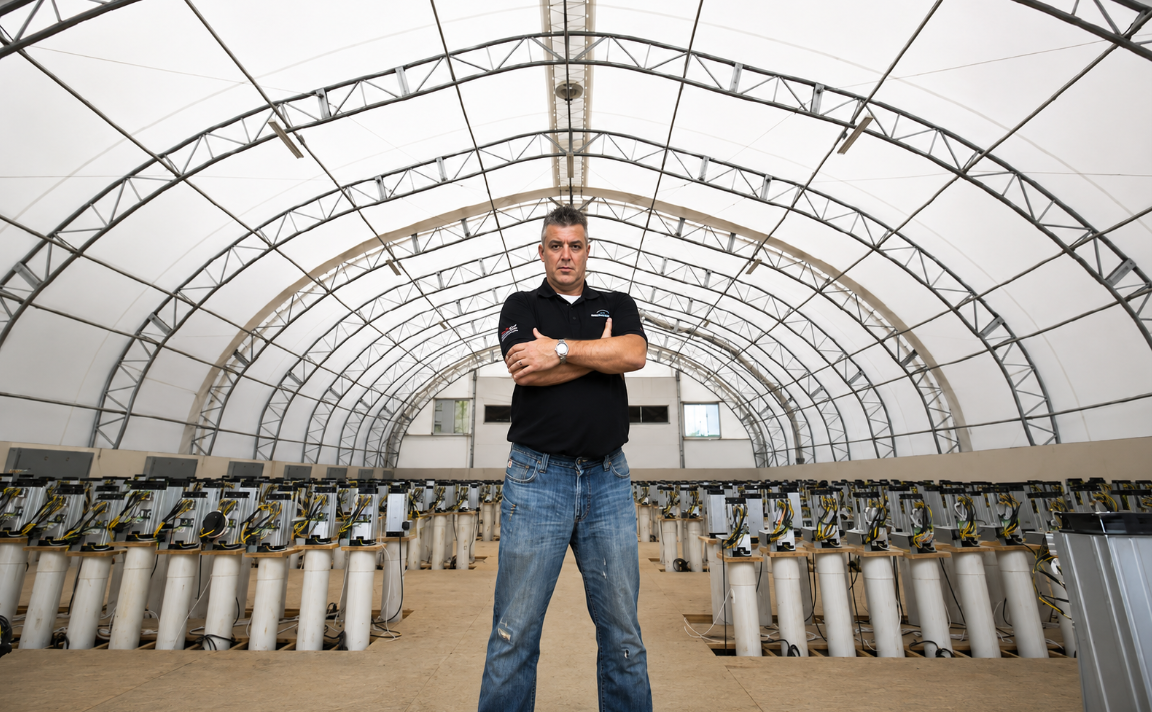
Benoit Laliberte inside Data Center Domes

Beginning in 2018, Laliberté became involved in Bitcoin mining operations through entities associated with blockchain infrastructure development. Dome-shaped structures housing cryptocurrency mining equipment were installed on agricultural land in Sainte-Marie-Madeleine, Quebec. The installations were described as data-processing facilities designed to support high-capacity digital asset mining operations. The project relied on access to significant electrical capacity and was situated on land zoned for agricultural use. According to Data Center Dynamics, the Blockchain Dome campus used a passive cooling system in which outside air was drawn through underground tunnels, cooled through thermal exchange, and then directed toward the computing equipment. The same report also stated that related expansion plans contemplated the reuse of waste heat from the mining and data-processing operations to support adjacent greenhouse facilities.

=== Quebec Commission for the Protection of Farmland (CPTAQ) ===
In July 2018, Commission de protection du territoire agricole du Québec (CPTAQ) ruled that cryptocurrency mining did not constitute an agricultural activity under provincial land-use legislation and ordered cessation of operations. The CPTAQ decision concluded that the installation of data center infrastructure on protected farmland was inconsistent with permitted agricultural uses. Laliberté contested the ruling before the Tribunal administratif du Québec (TAQ). In April 2019, the Tribunal upheld the CPTAQ’s order requiring the removal of the installations. The TAQ determined that the use of computer equipment’s to heat greenhouse did not qualify as an agricultural enterprise under the governing statute. Subsequent appeals were pursued in Quebec courts.

== Quebec Provincial Continued enforcement and investigations ==
In November 2022, Laliberté faced enforcement proceedings relating to unpaid tax obligations connected to prior business activities. More than C$56 million was alleged to be owed to provincial and federal tax authorities over an extended period. Continued litigation concerned the agricultural land dispute and enforcement measures related to the mining installations. Ongoing regulatory challenges and financial proceedings were associated with the cryptocurrency ventures.

=== Conflict with the Quebec Government and Revenu Québec (QSC) ===
Laliberté has been involved for more than two decades in a series of legal and fiscal disputes with Quebec authorities, particularly with the QSC (Revenu Québec). These conflicts have been described as part of a prolonged confrontation over taxes, corporate structures, insolvency proceedings, and allegations of tax avoidance.

=== Early Tax Litigation and Claims (2000s) ===
The dispute became publicly visible in the late 2000s, when QSC sought to recover substantial sums from Laliberté in relation to unpaid corporate taxes and alleged undeclared revenues. In 2009, the tax agency was claiming approximately $24.2 million for the fiscal years 1997 to 2003, leading to multiple court challenges and procedural battles over assessments and prescription delays. Laliberté contested the claims, arguing that some of the assessments were issued outside statutory deadlines.

=== Offshore Structures and International Investments ===
Since the early 2000s, international entities linked to Laliberté’s business activities, including holdings registered in the Bahamas, Switzerland, Panama, have been documented. These structures were described as part of complex corporate networks spanning Quebec and foreign jurisdictions. In later years, some of these offshore arrangements were connected to broader investigations into tax havens, including references to the Pandora Papers leak.

=== Longstanding Tax Dispute ===
In 2022, Laliberté had allegedly accumulated more than $56 million in taxes, penalties, and interest allegedly owed to the state over an eleven-year period. He was described as continuing to conduct business through trusts and foreign entities while being involved in prolonged insolvency litigation. The same investigation raised questions about the pace and effectiveness of enforcement efforts by Quebec authorities, noting that government agencies declined to comment publicly on the case. Laliberté still owe more than 56 millions dollars to the government.

=== Provincial Statute Proceedings ===
In November 2022, prosecutors from Quebec Revenue Agency brought notices of infraction against Laliberté, alleging failures to remit corporate fiscal obligations linked to companies in the Téléphone-Navigata-Westel group.

=== Ongoing Public Debate ===
The Laliberté case has been cited in Quebec political discussions as an example of the challenges governments face in combating tax evasion and recovering funds tied to offshore financial arrangements. Opposition parties have used the case to call for stronger enforcement tools and reforms targeting tax havens.

== U.S. and Canadian Legal Disputes and Litigation ==
For more than two decades, Benoit Laliberté has been involved in sustained litigation in Québec, British Columbia, federal Canadian tribunals, and United States federal courts. His disputes began in the early 2000s with regulatory and commercial proceedings in Quebec, followed by enforcement actions and tax litigation involving Revenu Québec. In 2013–2014, affiliated telecommunications entities were subject to proceedings before the Canada Industrial Relations Board concerning union certification and employer status. In 2016, companies within the TNW Group entered restructuring proceedings under the Companies’ Creditors Arrangement Act. The matter generated multiple appeals before the British Columbia Court of Appeal, including 2017. These decisions addressed jurisdictional limits and disputes over corporate asset ownership. Across jurisdictions, Laliberté has repeatedly contested regulatory, commercial, and financial determinations through appellate and trial courts. The litigation has spanned corporate, insolvency, labour, tax, intellectual property, and cryptocurrency matters.

=== Investel Capital Corporation Patents ===
Beginning in 2013, Laliberté became the CEO of Investel Capital Corporation, an investment entity focused on telecommunications assets and intellectual property development. Laliberté was named as inventor on multiple filings related to telephony-over-data systems, mobile authentication platforms, and streaming content delivery technologies between 2013 and 2016. Among the filings were applications covering “Mobile operator-mediated telephony-over-data systems,” “Secure mobile communication systems,” and “Call circuit selection management methods.” Other filings addressed user-generated content platforms and advertising integration systems marketed under the name iFramed. In 2016, Canadian and U.S. patent records show that certain patents in the iFramed family were granted.

=== Snapchat litigation (2016) ===
On August 24, 2016, Investel Capital Corporation filed a patent infringement lawsuit in the Federal Court of Canada against Snapchat, alleging infringement of geofiltering technology related to its user content sharing patents. Investel asserted rights connected to digital content overlays and location-based content sharing. The litigation attracted international attention due to Snapchat’s prominence in the social media sector. The iFramed patent portfolio asserted by Investel had been appraised at approximately US$1 billion by patent analysis firm TechInsights. Investel asserted rights connected to digital content overlays and location-based content sharing. In the United States, affiliated entities initiated federal litigation, including a patent infringement claim against Snapchat.

=== Bitcoin (BCH) litigation ===
In 2018, a Florida-based corporation linked to Laliberté filed a federal lawsuit relating to the Bitcoin Cash blockchain dispute. The proceedings named industry figures and cryptocurrency exchanges as defendants.

== Inventions ==
Through Investel Capital Corporation, Laliberté has been named as inventor on multiple patent applications and granted patents in Canada, the United States, and internationally under the Patent Cooperation Treaty. These filings relate primarily to telecommunications systems, mobile authentication technologies, streaming content delivery methods, and user-generated content platforms. Laliberté, through Investel Capital Corporation, currently holds several international patents and patents-pending. Among those are:

=== Paid-to-View ===
In 2013 Laliberté developed Paid-to-View, a patent-pending technology primarily for streaming content services such as Cable TV and IPTV whereby subscribers have the option to watch their television programs with a branded overlay provided by advertisers. Based on the length of time this overlay is used, advertisers provide incentives such as reduction of their telecommunications bill, discounts, and cash by check or prepaid credit card. Geolocation filters and demographics determine the overlay options and incentives provided.

Investel filed for a patent for Paid-to-View in Canada under application number 2,917,948, in the US under serial number 14/993,661, and internationally under the Patent Cooperation Treaty, application number PCT.CA2014/050628. The filings describe a method by which advertising content may be embedded within streamed programming and selectively displayed to users in exchange for incentives. Applications were filed in Canada (CA 2,917,948), the United States (US 14/993,661), and internationally under the Patent Cooperation Treaty (PCT/CA2014/050628).

=== iFramed ===
In 2013, Investel filed patent applications relating to a user content sharing system incorporating automated external content integration, marketed as “iFramed.” The system described in the filings concerns the overlay of branded content onto user-generated media distributed through social platforms. A related Canadian patent (CA 2,887,596) was granted in June 2016. In 2013 Laliberté invented iFramed, an online system for creating advertising campaigns on social media. This consists of a back office platform for the advertiser and a smartphone and tablet application which allows users to upload branded content onto their social media accounts. It also provides users with a permanent personal digital copyright watermark on their content. Users can then be paid for sharing this content on social media when they select an iFramed sponsor or advertiser and permit iFramed to overlay the sponsor or advertiser's logo or message on it. Once the content is posted, the user receives a financial credit to their iFramed account. iFramed users can also choose to support affinity groups such as charities, schools, local sports teams, and community initiatives by donating their credits automatically and instantly to these organizations.

Investel filed for a patent for iFramed in Canada under application number 2,863,124, in the US under application number 502660891, and internationally under the Patent Cooperation Treaty, application number PCT/CA2014/050628. In June 2016 iFramed was granted patent number 2,887,596 in Canada.

In August 2016, Investel filed a lawsuit in the Federal Court of Canada against Snapchat for patent infringement related to the iFramed patent.

=== Internet Personal Communication Service (iPCS) ===
In 2014, Laliberté developed the Internet Personal Communication System (iPCS), a Smartphone Over IP (SoIP) technology which uses data only to provide all voice and text services from a cloud-based platform. iPCS utilizes a thin client which interfaces with the cloud to provide enhanced security and access to all iPCS functionality. It operates seamlessly between Wi-Fi and 4G/LTE and can be used anywhere where wireless data is the available.

The service is login-based and any iPCS subscriber can therefore use any phone with any iPCS SIM card to access their account and services. No user data or user profile information resides on the device as everything is stored in the iPCS cloud. iPCS uses generic and identical SIM cards, which are used only to provide access to its network, making the subscriber independent from any SIM, device, or network. Any iPCS-enabled device can be used by any iPCS subscriber via the login procedure, allowing for multiple profiles on a single device.

Investel filed for six patents for iPCS in Canada under application numbers 2,910,654, 2,910,520, 2,871,283, 2,871,290, 2,871,249, and 2,871,247, and internationally under the Patent Cooperation Treaty number PCT/CA2015/051119.

iPCS was developed with the support of the Canadian Scientific Research and Experimental Development Program (SRED). It was launched in beta in October 2014.

== Other References ==
- Ravensbergen, Jan. "PC Guy." The Gazette [Montreal] 28 Oct. 1996: C3. Print.
- MacGregor, Alison. "Helping the Little Guys out." The Gazette [Montreal] 23 June 2000, Business sec.: C2. Print.
- MacDonald, Don. "Jitec, Herbert Black Clash." The Gazette [Montreal] 14 Oct. 2000, Business sec.: G1, G3. Print.
- MacDonald, Don. "Jitec Gets the Runaround." The Gazette [Montreal] 20 Mar. 2001, Business sec.: D1. Print.
- Gibbens, Robert. "Jitec Clears Founder of Wrongdoing." National Post [Toronto] 25 May 2001, Financial sec.: C5. Print.
- Vailles, Francis. "Benoit Laliberté poursuit le courtier Canaccord." La Presse [Montreal] 3 Oct. 2003, Affaires sec.: 4. Print.
- Marotte, Bertrand. "Ex-Jitec Boss Suing Quebec Watchdog." Globe and Mail [Toronto] 12 Nov. 2003, Business sec. Print.
- Bisson, Alan. "Des accusations criminelles ont été portées contre un ex-enquêteur de la CMVQ." Le Journal De Montréal 19 Nov. 2003, Affaire sec.: 58. Print.
- Baril, Hélène. "La CMVQ accepte de continuer à payer un enquêteur congédie." La Presse [Montreal] 25 Nov. 2003, Affaires sec.: 4. Print.
- Cousineau, Sophie. "Le côté obscur de Herbert Black." La Presse [Montreal] 26 Nov. 2005, Affaires sec.: 1-3. Print.
- Tedesco, Theresa. "A Question of Proper Conduct." National Post [Toronto] 19 Nov. 2004, Financial Post sec.: 1, 6, 7. Print
- Arcand, Denis. "Benoît Laliberté devant la Cour." La Presse [Montreal] 29 Oct. 2007, Affaires sec.: 1, 4. Print.
