= CIK =

CIK or Cik may refer to:

== Organisations ==
- CIK Telecom, a Canadian telecommunications company
- Euroclear Belgium, a Belgian central securities depository formerly known by the acronym CIK (for Caisse Interprofessionnelle de Dépôts et de Virements de Titres / Interprofessionele Effectendeposito- en Girokas)
- Confederazione Italiana Kendo, a Kendo Federation in Italy
- Commission Internationale de Karting, the primary international sanctioning body for Kart racing

== Places ==
- Čik, a river in northern Serbia
- Chalkyitsik Airport (IATA: CIK), an airport in Chalkyitsik, Alaska

== Science and technology ==
- Cytokine-induced killer cell, a subset of natural killer T cells
- Crypto Ignition Key, or KSD-64, a security token developed by the U.S. National Security Agency

== Other uses ==
- Central Index Key, a number assigned by the US Securities and Exchange Commission to identify financial filings
- Chiksana railway station (station code CIK), a railway station in Chak Baltikari, Uttar Pradesh, India
