= Avetria Networks =

Canadian telecommunications company

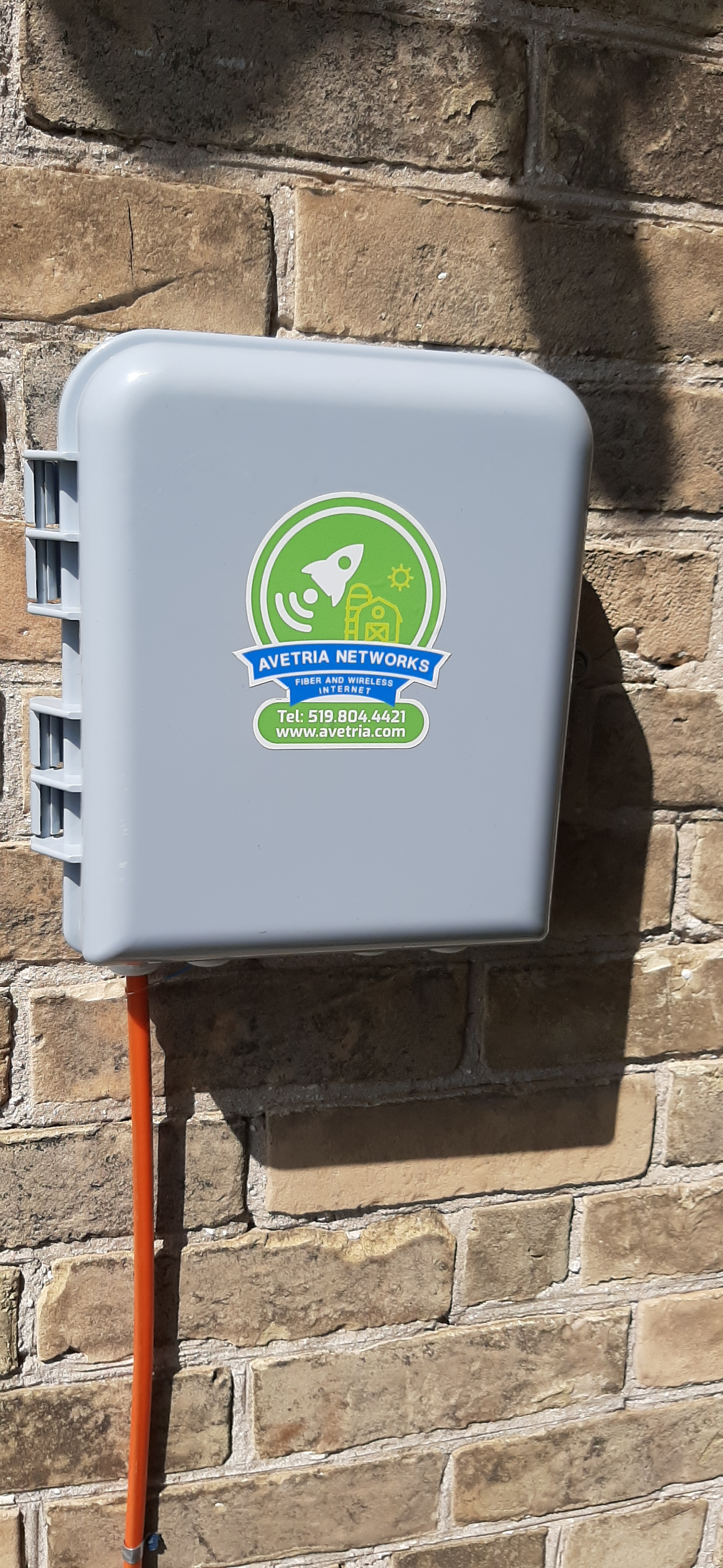
Avetria Network FTTH ONU Box

Avetria Networks Inc. is a wholly owned private Canadian corporation. As a regional telecommunications company in the province of Ontario, Avetria provides telecommunications products and services including wireless and fibre internet access, voice, and IPTV television. The company is based in Southwestern Ontario, Maryhill, Ontario; it was originally based in Bloomingdale, Ontario. The company was first formed as a fixed wireless internet provider to provide internet to the communities of Woolwich, Maryhill, Ariss, West Montrose, Winterbourne, Conestogo and North Waterloo. Avetria Networks competes in the fibre to the home sector with Rogers Communications and Bell Canada.

== History ==
Founded in 2014, Avetria was awarded federal funding for two grants by Innovation, Science and Economic Development Canada, a department of the Government of Canada. Avetria was chosen to develop and deploy Fibre to the Home (FTTH) in the Region of Waterloo, Township of Woolwich, communities of Bloomingdale, Winterbourne, and West Montrose while connecting all three villages to city-quality internet in the Township of Woolwich. The funding was provided to connect 286 under serviced households with internet service that was at least 50 megabits per second (Mbps) download and 10 Mbps upload.

Avetria started their first fibre to the home project in Winterbourne in March 2018. They also provide fibre internet to the Foundation Christian School of Winterbourne.

In 2020 the company was part of a consortium, along with Wireless Farm, installing FTTH in Ariss, Ontario.

The company was awarded a Municipal Access Agreement with the City of Waterloo in September 2021.
