= EBOX =

Canadian telecommunications company

- Formerly: Electronic Box (1997–2016)
- Type: Brand of Bell Canada
- Industry: Telecommunications
- Founded: 1997
- Founder: Jean-Philippe Béïque and Dominic Létourneau
- Headquarters: 100−1225 Saint-Charles West, Longueuil, Quebec, Canada
- Number of locations: 1
- Area served: Ontario and Quebec
- Key people: Isis Thiago De Souza (CEO)
- Products: High speed Internet; IPTV; VoIP
- Number of employees: 400 (2020)
- Parent: Bell Canada
- ASN: 1403
- Website: ebox.ca

EBOX is a brand of Bell Canada headquartered in Longueuil, Quebec. EBOX offers a wide range of high-speed Internet plans in Ontario and Quebec as well as VoIP Digital Home Phone service. EBOX also provides IPTV (Internet Protocol television).

== History ==
Between 2007 and 2012 EBOX, formerly known as Electronic Box, increased its net sales by 1,859%. Following a decision from the CRTC in 2011 favoring Canadian independent telecom service providers, Electronic Box was one of the first independent providers to offer Internet services at a reduced rate.

In 2016, Electronic Box simplified its name by rebranding to EBOX.

In 2017, EBOX launched their largest advertising campaign in collaboration with the DentsuBos advertising agency which allowed them to grow their customer base to 70,000 subscribers.

In April 2018, EBOX launched their IPTV service. which enabled them to expand their customer base to 130,000 subscribers.

In 2019, EBOX was ranked 227 as a PROFIT 500 company which recognizes the top 500 Canadian companies which had the highest annual growth.

In a surprise decision in May 2021, the CRTC cancelled their wholesale tariff rate reductions that were proposed two years earlier in 2019. This had a devastating impact on many independent telecom providers such as EBOX who had already lowered their rates in anticipation of having the reduced access rates implemented retroactively. EBOX CEO Jean-Philippe Béïque subsequently criticised the CRTC's decision, which granted large telecom incumbent providers to charge what they would like to. In January 2022, EBOX announced a rate increase for all of their subscribers, which marked the first one 2015. However, the increase was reverted on February 10, 2022, before it was even fully implemented with no explanation provided.

On February 24, 2022, Bell formally announced their acquisition of EBOX. EBOX co-founders Jean-Philippe Béique and Dominic Létourneau announced at the same time that they have resigned from EBOX and the company will continue to operate as an independent brand. Some of the reasons they provided for the sale was due to financial challenges caused by the CRTC's 2021 decision along with increased costs related to higher data usage caused by a much higher number of people working from home.

== Services ==
EBOX offers their services as a third party provider by using the distribution networks of Bell, Cablevision, Rogers, Vidéotron and Cogeco.

=== Internet ===
Internet services are offered either by FTTH, DSL or cable, with download speeds between 5 and 1000 Mbit/s and data usage plans from 100 GB/month to unlimited and certain limited plans offer an unlimited off-peak data usage period for a nominal extra cost.

=== Phone ===
EBOX also has home or office phone service when combined with one of their Internet plans.

=== Television ===
The EBOX television service is offered on an Android TV based platform. The service uses a Sagemcom's set top box (STB) made for EBOX which allows access to Google Play Store and includes Chromecast functionality.

During 2019, support for non STB devices was added including Sony Bravia Android TV, Nvidia Shield (2017, 2019 and Pro), Xiaomi MiBox 4S and Amazon FireTV (2nd generation or higher including TV's with FireTV built-in).

In 2020, a cloud PVR service was launched which allows subscribers to make recordings without requiring a local hard disk unit and a second set top box (STB), made by Technicolor for EBOX, was introduced.

== CNOC member ==
EBOX was a member of CNOC (Canadian Network Operators Consortium) until 2022 when they were no longer an eligible independent telecom provider following their acquisition by Bell.

== EBOX campus ==
In 2016, EBOX announced a 7.5 million dollar investment for the installation of Campus EBOX, a workplace for 150 of their employees.

== See also ==
- Distributel
