= PlanHub =

- Formerly: Celagora
- Company type: Joint-stock company
- Industry: Telecommunications
- Founded: 2013
- Headquarters: Montreal, Quebec, Canada
- Area served: Canada
- Key people: Nadir Marcos Mechaiekh Simon (CEO & cofounder), Guillaume Marcade (CTO & cofounder)
- Products: Cell phones and wireless plans, internet plans and cable television plans
- Number of employees: < 1,000
- Website: www.planhub.ca

PlanHub is an independent Canadian telecommunications company specializing in price comparisons for cellular telephone plans, internet service provider plans and cable television pricing for the Canadian market. Created in 2013, this tool allows users to compare pricing of various Canadian operators based on their needs.

In 2019 PlanHub partnered with Protégez-Vous, a non-profit organization similar to Consumer Reports that offers consumer advice to francophones in Québec and Canada, to offer its phone and internet package comparison via the magazine's website.

PlanHub has been featured on several francophone television programmes in Canada such as on Radio-Canada's La Facture where the founders showed Canadian consumers how PlanHub compares internet, cellular and cable costs. PlanHub also was featured on a Télé-Québec show, Ça vaut le coût.

== History ==
PlanHub was launched in Montreal, Canada in 2013, under the name Celagora, with the initial goal of allowing comparison of cell phone plans offered in each Canadian province, based on consumer preferences. Ultimately this was meant to help consumers lower their cellular plan bills.

In August 2014 the company changed its name; Celagora became PlanHub.

In 2018, the search tool expanded to include comparisons of internet packages offered in Canada. In 2021, a TV package comparison tool was scheduled to appear on the platform.

The company currently compares over 50,000 plan combinations from over 90 providers and over 5,000 consumer reviews of Canadian phone and internet carriers.

With Bell's acquisition of Quebec internet provider, EBox, PlanHub became a heavily used tool to compare prices with other internet providers.

In 2023, Branchez-vous was acquired by PlanHub with the aim of reviving the media outlet and continuing its legacy in technology and digital culture journalism.
