= IDNR =

IDNR may refer to:

- IDNR-TV, a Canadian television channel
- Illinois Department of Natural Resources
