= Zooid BBS =

ZOOiD BBS ("the zoo of ids," or alternatively referencing zooid) was a Toronto area Bulletin board system in 1986 - 1993 that served a creative community. The sysop was David H. Mason, assisted by several others. Among its members was Rasmus Lerdorf.

Initially a Commodore 64 based BBS running Spence BBS software, it became the development site for M1 BBS software, which eventually expanded to about 13 systems before ZOOiD switched to Waffle, and then Xenix to support UUCP and multiple phone lines. In 1993, ZOOiD 'merged' with R-Node to become Internex Online, the first consumer Internet Service Provider in Canada.
