= Internex Online =

Internex Online, usually known as io.org, was the first consumer dial-up ISP in Canada.

== History ==
It was formed by the merger of r-node and zooid BBS, two Bulletin board and Usenet/uucp systems, in early 1993. At its peak, it had about 10,000 customers, and was credited for leading in low cost access.

In November 1995 Internex was bought by Greenlight Communications, and six months later Greenlight sold it, along with most of Greenlight's assets, to ACC Telenterprises, where it was quickly absorbed into their general pool of internet subscribers.

Aside from its grass-roots and hackish beginnings, Internex Online was notable for an early commitment to provide free services (free access was available during non peak times), as well as an involved community.

Internex Online was the first home of iComm, a community initiative providing internet services to charitable and non-profit organizations.

== See also ==
- Epifora
