= TotalTV (Canadian TV provider) =

Canadian IPTV provider

- Formerly: Zazeen
- Company type: Subsidiary
- Industry: Telecommunications
- Founded: 2013
- Headquarters: Toronto, Ontario, Canada
- Area served: Ontario, Quebec
- Products: IPTV
- Parent: Distributel

TotalTV is an IPTV service offered by Distributel, launched in 2013 as Zazeen TV. The service is available in urban areas of Ontario and Quebec.

== Services ==
=== Television ===
TotalTV is a traditional subscription television service delivered via IPTV. All TotalTV subscriptions must be paired with high speed Internet service from the Distributel family of brands or another eligible TotalTV agent.

== Rebranding ==
In September 2020, Zazeen was rebranded to TotalTV. As part of the name change, new customers are no longer able to directly sign up for service. Instead, signing up for new service must be made via Distributel or a Distributel affiliated ISP. Also unlike Zazeen, TotalTV no longer offers Internet or VoIP services.
