= IDNR-TV =

Canadian TV channel

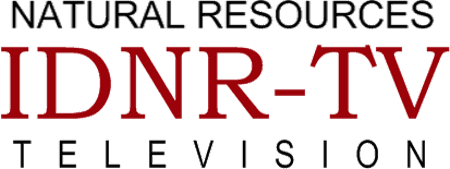
- IDNR-TV logo
- Country: Canada
- Broadcast area: National
- Headquarters: Toronto, Ontario

Programming
- Picture format: 480i (SDTV)

Ownership
- Owner: IDNR-TV Inc.

History
- Launched: October 2, 2006
- Closed: 2020

Links
- Website: IDNR-TV

IDNR-TV (an abbreviation for In Depth Natural Resources Television), sometimes referred to as Natural Resources Television, was a Canadian Category B specialty channel owned by IDNR-TV Inc.

IDNR-TV's programming was devoted to the coverage of natural resources including industry related and social issues programming. Specifically, programming focusing on the latest trends affecting the natural resources sector, market news, coverage of industry events, educational programming, and more. The channel was licensed to provide a bilingual service in English and French. While the vast majority of the programming was broadcast in English, French programs are also aired.

Launched in 2006, the channel ceased broadcasting in 2020, however, the company continues to operate as a producer of documentary films.

== History ==
In October 2004, IDNR-TV was granted approval by the Canadian Radio-television and Telecommunications Commission (CRTC) to launch a channel called The Natural Resources Television Channel, described as "an English-and French-language Category 2 specialty programming undertaking that will offer programming focusing on the field of natural resources."

The channel was launched on October 2, 2006 as IDNR-TV on selected Persona digital cable systems (now called EastLink), and in early 2007, the channel was launched on Cablevision du Nord.

A few years after EastLink purchased Persona, IDNR-TV was removed from all EastLink systems, leaving Cablevision du Nord in Quebec the only distributor of the channel. In May 2012, the channel reached its first major distribution deal with Cogeco in Quebec, however, the deal fell through in August 2012. The deal would have seen IDNR-TV carried on Cogeco's basic service in Quebec in the fall of 2012.

In 2020, according to the channel's website, the channel was no longer broadcasting. It is unknown to the public as to why the channel ceased broadcasting.
