= Herbert Black =

Canadian businessman

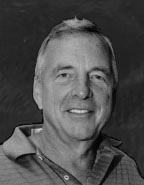
Herbert Black

Herbert Black is a Canadian businessman, art collector, and philanthropist. He is currently President & CEO of American Iron & Metal Company Inc.

== American Iron & Metal Company, Inc. (AIM) ==
American Iron & Metal is based in Montreal, Quebec, and currently has over 2,500 employees and 80 locations around the globe, with revenues exceeding $2 billion. Established in 1936 by Black's father, Peter, AIM buys, services, processes, and supplies all types of ferrous and nonferrous scrap metal. Black took over AIM with his brother Ronald in 1970. A global leader in metal recycling, manufacturing, and environmental services, AIM has grown both organically as well as via acquisition. The company has branched out into five separate lines of business: AIM Recycling, AIM Solder, Delsan AIM (demolition services), AIM Kenny U-Pull (secondary auto parts) and AIM Éco-Centre (dry waste treatment).

== Biography ==
Herbert Black joined his father's scrap metal recycling business, American Iron and Metal Company Inc. ("AIM") in 1961, at the age of 17. Over the past 55+ years, he has played a key role in transforming AIM from a local scrap operation to one of the largest and most successful recycling enterprises in North America.

Mr. Black was awarded the 2005 Ernst & Young Entrepreneur of the year award in the Business to Business category as well as the 2005 National Citation for Entrepreneurial Philanthropy awarded by Ernst & Young.

== Legal Controversies ==
=== Sumitomo ===
In June 1996, Sumitomo, at the time the largest trader of copper in the world, announced that it had suspended its chief copper trader, Yasuo Hamanaka, for secret, unauthorized transactions. It was alleged that he was able to artificially raise the price of copper by manipulating the company to purchase up to 2 million tonnes of copper.

Three players were linked to the scandal as short sellers: George Soros with Quantum Fund, Julian Robertson with Tiger Fund, and Black with AIM. While trading on two other stock exchanges, Black assumed as a result of this that the price of copper would decrease as supply appeared to be superior to demand. While he lost money from other trading activities in late 1995, he profited greatly from the announcement of the suspension by Sumitomo as the price of copper dropped significantly. However, he still claimed to have lost money from his trading activity due to the scandal and launched an official complaint with the Commodity Futures Trading Commission (CFTC), the body which regulated commodities trading.

It was as a result of this complaint that he met Denis O'Keefe, the deputy director of Compliance for the CFTC, and they began to meet regularly. It was subsequently revealed that Black would provide information to O'Keefe and based on this information, persuaded him to continue the investigation of Sumitomo. O'Keefe, a practicing lawyer, was secretly taking folders related to the CFTC case on Sumitomo and providing them to Black, and was also advising him on how to retrieve other documents with relevant information through the Freedom of Information Act, allegedly for the purpose of profiting from Sumitomo's apparent trading manipulation.

In December 2000 O'Keefe was dismissed from the CFTC, and when he left he took additional documents related to the Sumitomo case to give to Black. With this information and that of other documents he had acquired, in April 2002 Black launched a lawsuit in the US against Sumitomo, as well as against Global Minerals & Metals and Merrill Lynch. In May, he launched a second lawsuit in the UK. Black alleged in these suits that his losses were at least US$256 million.

In its defense, Global stated how similar this case was to other cases in Black's "'history': They stated that his pattern was to 'corrupt' individuals and convince them to 'betray' the trust that had been confided in them." O'Keefe was a witness in the American case and admitted to perjury.

Lawyers arguing against Black in both the US and the UK trials discovered that he was trading on multiple exchanges and was short selling in both accounts, and so questioned whether he suffered any losses as a result of the decline in copper prices. They soon realized that he was using one account to cover up short selling on the other, all the while declaring losses from each side.

All parties in the American case eventually reached an out-of-court settlement. However the judge in the case required that Black "abandons with compensation the prosecution in England" as well. He was also ordered to return all illegally obtained evidence to the government and sign an affidavit or he would personally charge Black for racketeering.

Dissatisfied by O'Keefe's lack of punishment, Sumitomo went to the Bar of the District of Columbia which conducted a disciplinary investigation and found him to be in violation of 11 rules of the Code of Ethics. He was later struck from the Bar.

=== Christie's and Sotheby's Auction Houses ===
In January 2000 Black was the lead plaintiff in a successful class action lawsuit accusing the heads of Christie's and Sotheby's auction houses of price-fixing their products. An avid art collector, he noticed he was no longer able to avoid sellers' fees by playing one house against the other in negotiations, and so began his investigation into the potential collusion between them. All the while, he continued to buy from each house, believing he would eventually be compensated when he had enough evidence to launch his lawsuit.

=== JITEC ===
In 2000, Black allegedly repeated the process by forging a friendship with up-and-coming businessman Benoît Laliberté. Laliberté, whose company JITEC's stock had risen from CDN$3.80 per share in late July 2000 to CDN$11.65 in only a few weeks, met Black in September 2000 and he became an advisor to Laliberté. Black soon asked for free trading shares in JITEC, a request which was denied by Laliberté. Then in October 2000, Black filed a complaint with the Quebec Securities Commission (QSC) against Laliberté stating that he was involved in questionable trading that helped boost JITEC's stock. Among the staff Black met with at the QSC was Jean Lorrain who was the Director of Compliance. Lorrain later went on to testify at an inquiry into the matter that Black had "put enormous pressure on the commission" to quickly "halt trading in JITEC stock" but that he had "presented himself as not having any personal connection to JITEC." He described Black as "an industrialist who has had disputes before (…) with other securities commissions, always as an informant or as (…) a white knight, in the way of a person who crusades against illegal activities. (…) he always turns a personal profit from the scandals in which he acts as an informant."

Another investigator of the case, Paul Trudeau of the Commission des valeurs mobilières du Québec (CVMQ), now known as the Autorité des marchés financiers (AMF), admitted to have accepted a bribe of $1,000 from Black in 2000. After their initial meeting regarding JITEC, Trudeau was frequently invited by Black to his home in Westmount for drinks. This was deemed highly unusual by his superiors. It was then that Black would extract information from him about JITEC. When they were out for dinner one night, Black invited Trudeau back to this car and gave him $1000 cash in return for his secrecy. This was revealed by a fellow employee of the CVMQ, Catherine Gagnon. She had been informed of the bribe through an acquaintance, but when she confronted Trudeau about it she feared he would become suicidal if the truth was known. For this reason, she kept this information to herself for three month, as well as because she "feared for her life", knowing of Black's wealth, power, and reputation. She finally revealed what she knew after she found out that another QSC investigator, Laurent Lemieux, was fired for leaking information about the JITEC case to the press. Trudeau was dismissed from the QSC but appealed against this in court. As the QSC were eager to be rid of him, it was decided that he would receive his salary through to December 2006 so long as he would never come within 75 feet of any QSC office. While Black, denied the bribe, he later admitted to shorting JITEC's stock after believing it would plummet when a news article came out based on information that he had given the QSC, along with privileged information he had received through his connection to Laliberté.

Don MacDonald, a writer for The Montreal Gazette, would later admit to having Black as an informant on the JITEC case. This was seen as questionable as Black was not an insider and never an official shareholder in JITEC. There would often be articles written by MacDonald with information on the case that were published earlier in the day than when the information was made public. While Black and others were short selling JITEC stock, the price was allegedly artificially boosted from CAD3.00 to CAD11.00, causing a significant loss to all short sellers. This led to a class action lawsuit with the initial $25 000 funded by Black for through Kugler Kandestin Attorneys. MacDonald already had an article published about it in The Gazette the morning of the day that the lawsuit was launched. MacDonald also had an article published regarding the cease-trading order on Laliberté signed by Paul Trudeau the same morning that Laliberté received it in November 2000. Investors in JITEC had started rumours in online forums and chat rooms that MacDonald was gay and a pedophile in order to discredit him – something Laliberté firmly denies any involvement in. However, the constant bad publicity of JITEC continued to put downward pressure on its stock.

JITEC finally collapsed in 2001. As a result, numerous legal actions were launched by the parties involved. The class action suit is still pending.

=== Marc Rich and Denise Rich ===
Among Black's many high-profile friends was Denise Rich, US socialite and ex-wife of Marc Rich. Marc Rich, a former associate of Black, gained notoriety in 2001 when he received a controversial presidential pardon from then US President Bill Clinton on charges of tax evasion.

Black went on to sue Denise Rich for breach of contract as she had never paid him for what she thought was free advice from a friend. The case is ongoing.

=== "Eric and Lola" ===
Black was also involved in a landmark case of the economic rights of common-law partners in Quebec. "Eric and Lola" as they are known in the press due to a publication ban in Quebec, met in 1992 when Eric, then 32, was vacationing in Brazil. They began a relationship and Lola, then 17, soon moved to Quebec to be with him. After ten years together (making them a common law couple in Quebec) and three children, the relationship ended, but as they were not legally married Lola was not entitled to usual spousal support that would have been provided for her under Quebec law. Although she received a house worth $2.5 million, $36 500/month in child support, a car and chauffeur, a chef, and a nanny from Eric, Black, who briefly dated Lola after their separation, encouraged her to pursue legal action against him. Lola went on to sue Eric for a $50 million lump sum and an additional $56 000/month in alimony. After losing, Black said that he would personally fund her appeal. One of Lola's lawyers, Anne-France Goldwater, went on to sue Black in order to receive $57 000 in unpaid legal fees.

The Supreme Court ruled against Lola on January 25, 2013. The case is said to be precedent-setting for family law in Quebec.

=== Jean-Guy Hammelin and the Fonds de solidarité FTQ ===
In December 2007, AIM announced that it would be acquire its rival in the metal recycling industry of 20 years the Société nationale de ferrailles (SNF) belonging to brothers Bernard and Jean-Guy Hammelin for $64.2 million ($4.2 million of which would be held for three years).

After the acquisition Black claimed that the SNF had cashed in substantial operating losses and that he was unaware of such losses at the time he acquired the company. In 2011 he demanded more than $15 million in compensation for that, and among other "irregularities", Black accused Jean-Guy and the FTQ of hiding financial information, misrepresentation, and destroying documents. Black also said that Hamelin sold him SNF knowing that part of the Laval facility did not meet municipal zoning regulations and the Protection of Land and Agricultural Activities Act, forcing him to relocate the facility and costing him $4.6 million.

Hamelin denied the allegation. The defense countered that Black was aware of the financial difficulties of the SNF, so much that he put pressure on the Competition Bureau of Canada for acceptance on his bid. They also noted the eagerness of Black to buy his competitor, saying that he offered $10 million more than any other buyer. He also stated that on December 4, 2007, documents relating to finances, permits, and the list of disputes were delivered. Mr. Hamelin countersued for the $4.2 million owed and $200,000 in damages, plus interest.

The case is ongoing.

== Philanthropy ==
Herbert Black is well known in Montreal as a philanthropist, having donated considerably to several organizations and causes. He has donated millions of dollars to McGill University and its Montreal Neurological Institute and Hospital, as well as to the Maisonneuve-Rosemont Hospital. He endowed the Chair of Surgical Oncology at McGill University, funding research in oncology, as well as the Herbert Black Unit for Teaching and Learning in Medicine at McGill.
