= Bloomingdale, Ontario =

Coordinates: 43.509439°N 80.462463°W

Bloomingdale is an unincorporated community in Ontario, Canada. It is recognized as a designated place by Statistics Canada.

== Demographics ==
In the 2021 Census of Population conducted by Statistics Canada, Bloomingdale had a population of 230 living in 88 of its 90 total private dwellings, a change of 0% from its 2016 population of 230. With a land area of 0.59 km^{2} (0.23 sq mi), it had a population density of 389.8/km^{2} (1,009.7/sq mi) in 2021.

== See also ==
- List of communities in Ontario
- List of designated places in Ontario
