= Maryhill, Ontario =

Maryhill
- Unincorporated rural community
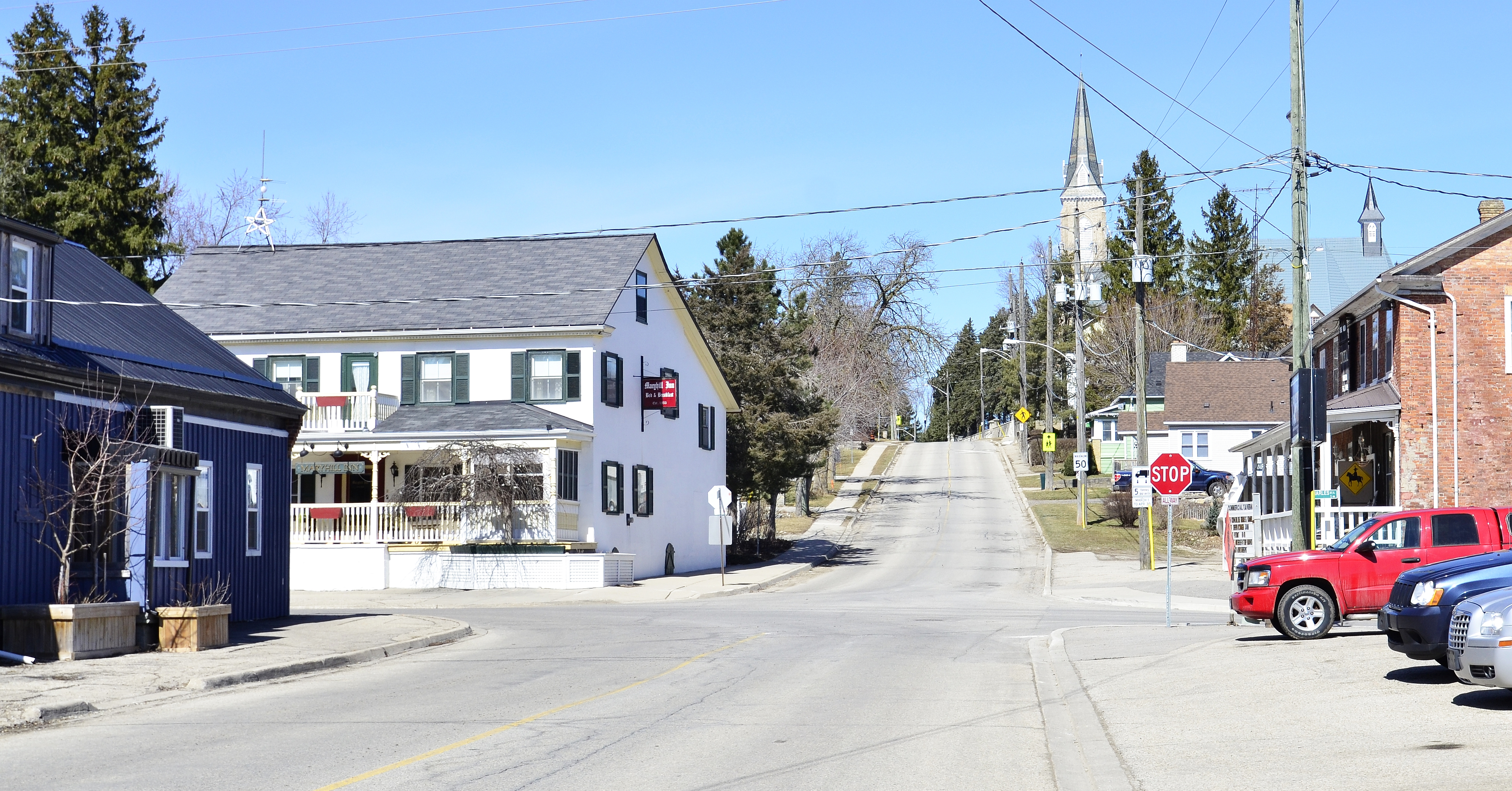
- Maryhill, Ontario

- Location within Regional Municipality of Waterloo Location within Southern Ontario
- Coordinates: 43°32′02″N 80°23′24″W
- Country: Canada
- Province: Ontario
- Region: Waterloo
- Township: Woolwich

Area
  - Land: 0.79 km^{2} (0.31 sq mi)

Population (2016)
  - Total: 576
  - Density: 733.6/km^{2} (1,900/sq mi)
- Time zone: UTC-5 (Eastern (EST))
  - Summer (DST): UTC-4 (EDT)
- GNBC Code: FCDTF

Maryhill is an unincorporated rural community in the township of Woolwich, Waterloo Region, Ontario, Canada. The population was 576 in 2016.

Hopewell Creek flows through the settlement.

== History ==
As European immigrants moved to the area in the early 1800s, the settlement was first called Rotenburg. Between 1827 and 1840, of the 48 settlers who arrived in Rotenburg, 36 were from Alsace and 12 were from Baden. A particularly large number arrived from Soufflenheim, Alsace, between 1828 and 1860. By 1832, there were 69 families in Rotenburg, and a population of 307.

The settlement was renamed New Germany, and German language newspapers sometimes referred to the settlement as Neu Deutschland.

In 1916, a historian wrote of the pioneer settlement:

One of the disagreeable features among the New Germany settlers was that, although composed of Germans almost exclusively, rivalry and uncharitable raillery between the people from different principalities was very prevalent. There was no German citizen because there was no Germany, each one was an Alsatian, Bavarian, a Prussian, etc. Every one considered his Principality the best and had a supreme contempt and ugly nicknames for all the others. This, however, has all passed away. All are now Canadians.

A school was erected in 1832, which served as a church on Sunday. It was the first Catholic church in the region. St. Boniface Roman Catholic Church was established near the school in 1834, named for Saint Boniface, the apostle of Germany. The current church was erected in 1877.

In 1852, a two-room brick school was built. During the winter the school enrolled over 100 students.

St. Boniface Hotel was erected in 1850, and for 70 years it was used as a stop for the stagecoach carrying mail and passengers between Waterloo and Guelph.

The early settlement had a blacksmith shop, brewery, cobbler, cooper, tailor, and three hotels.

Between 1860 and 1865, New Germany was afflicted by smallpox with "especial severity", and many residents had badly marked faces throughout their lives.

A post office was established in 1879.

In 1941, Canada Post requested that New Germany change its name because mail arriving from overseas was being misdirected to New Germany, Nova Scotia. Canadian Post suggested the name "Gort", after a British commander, or "Wavell", after a British General in Egypt. The community instead selected Maryhill; "Mary" because of their historical Catholic faith, and "hill" because of a prominent hill in the settlement.

Aerial view of Maryhill

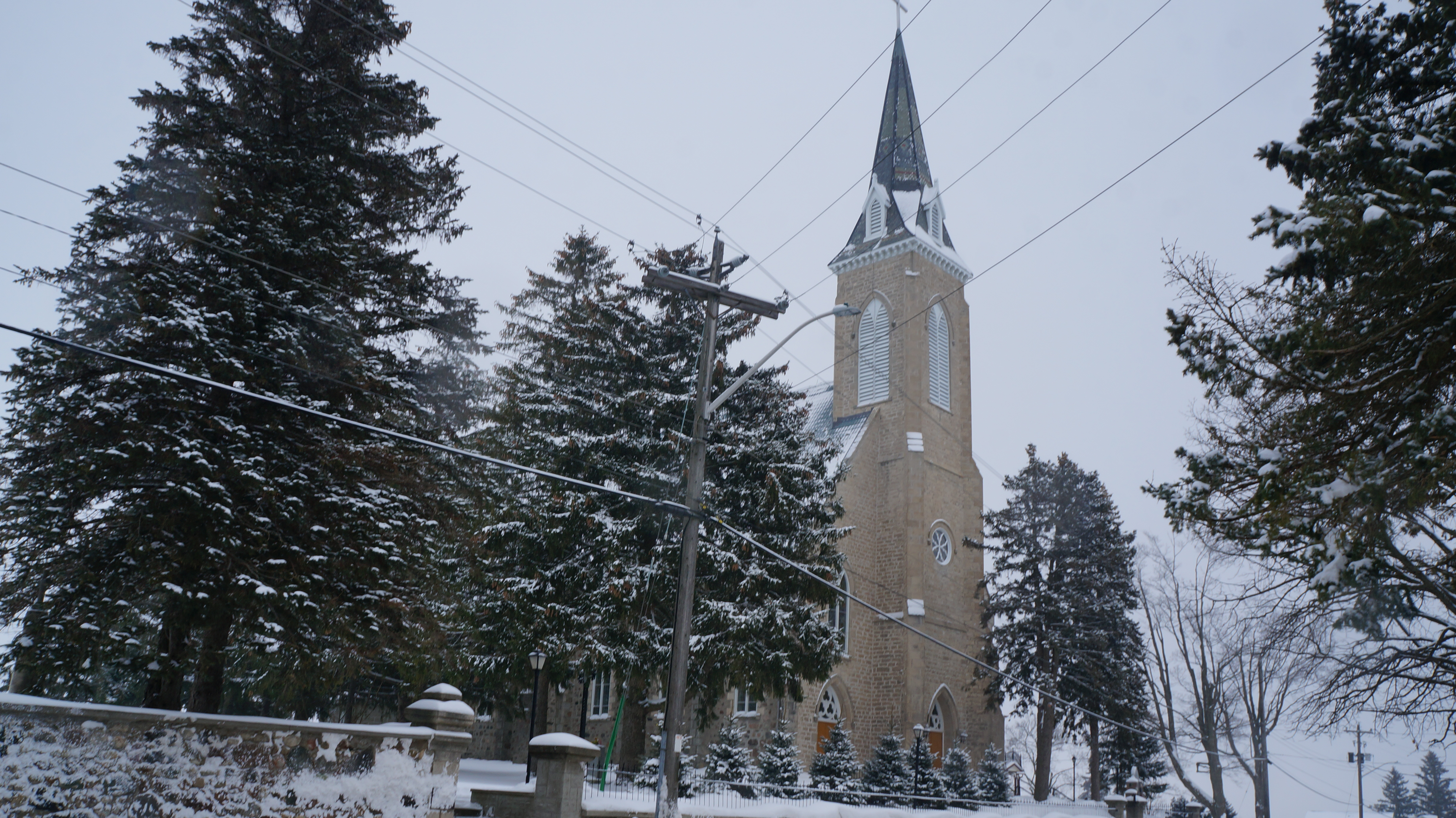
St. Boniface Church in Maryhill

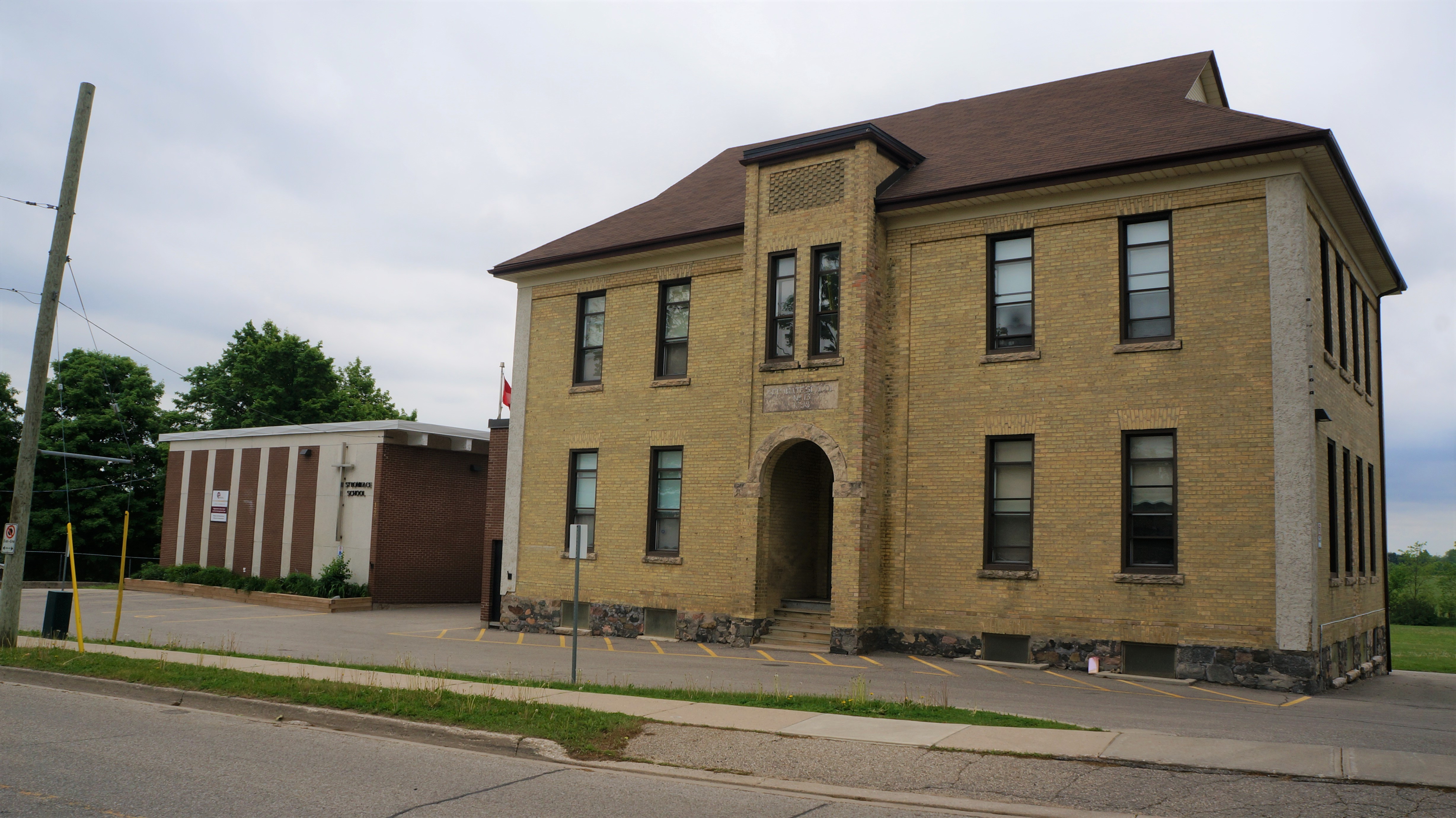
St. Boniface School in Maryhill

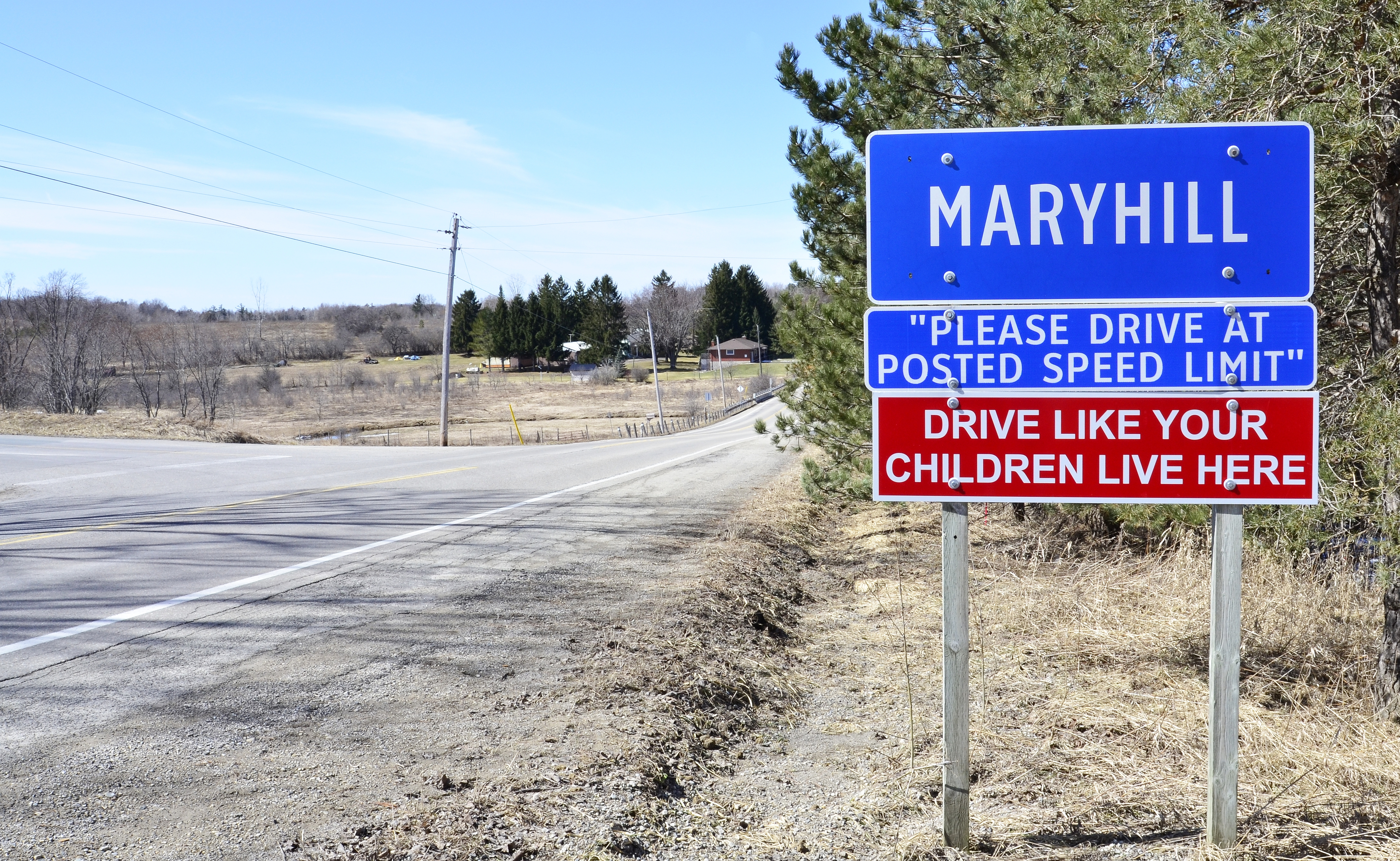
Arriving in Maryhill along Waterloo Regional Road 25

== Demographics ==
In the 2021 Census of Population conducted by Statistics Canada, Maryhill had a population of 605 living in 207 of its 210 total private dwellings, a change of 5% from its 2016 population of 576. With a land area of 0.79 km^{2} (0.31 sq mi), it had a population density of 765.8/km^{2} (1,983.5/sq mi) in 2021.

== Parks and recreation ==
Maryhill Heritage Park and Community Centre features a playground, ball diamond, group open space, multi-purpose court, soccer fields, outdoor ice rinks, and group picnic area.

== See also ==
- List of unincorporated communities in Ontario
