= Chiksana railway station =

Railway station in Rajasthan, India

Chiksana railway station चिकसाना रेलवे स्टेशन
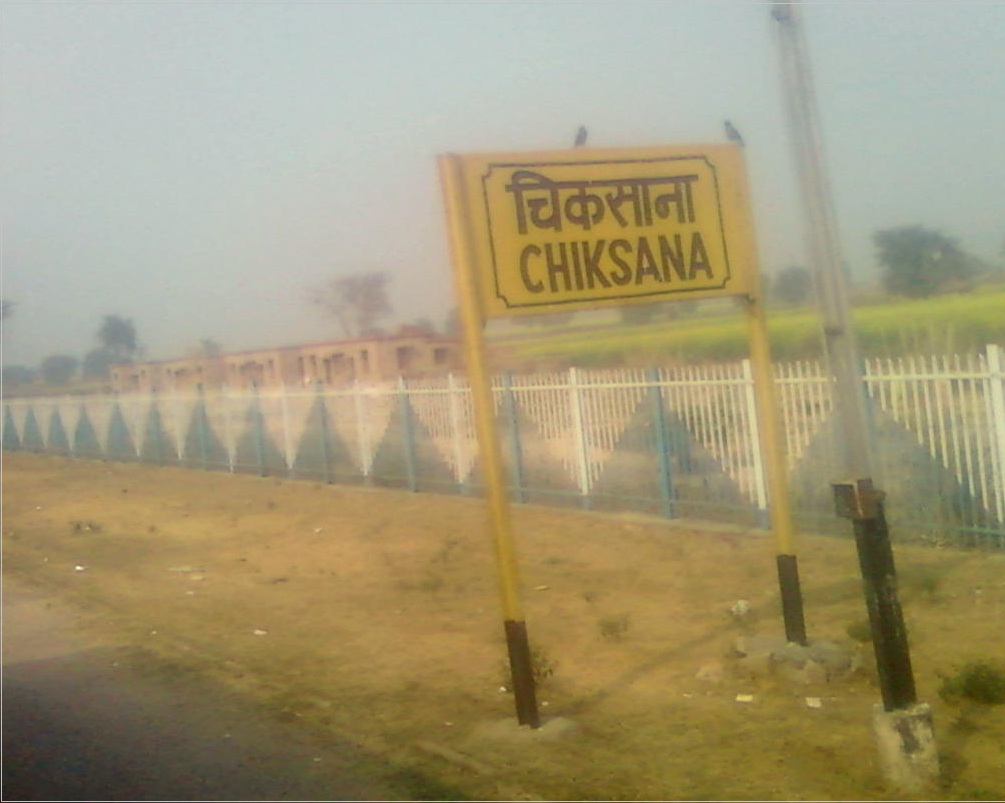

General information
- Location: Chak Baltikari, Rajasthan; India
- Elevation: 177 metres (581 ft)
- Operator: North Western Railway zone

Construction
- Structure type: Standard (on ground station)
- Parking: Yes

Other information
- Status: Functioning
- Station code: CIK
- Zone(s): North Central Railway zone
- Division(s): Agra
Location

Chiksana railway station (station code CIK) is a railway station located in Chak Baltikari, the Indian state of Rajasthan.

== Major trains ==
Five trains stop at Chiksana railway station.

- BKI–BARELLY PASSENGER
- BE/BKI PASS
- IDH–BKI DMU
- BTE–KSJ PASSENGER
- BKI–IDH SHUTTLE

== See also ==
- North Western Railway zone
- Western Railway zone
