= CIK Telecom =

Canadian telecommunications company

CIK Telecom Inc.

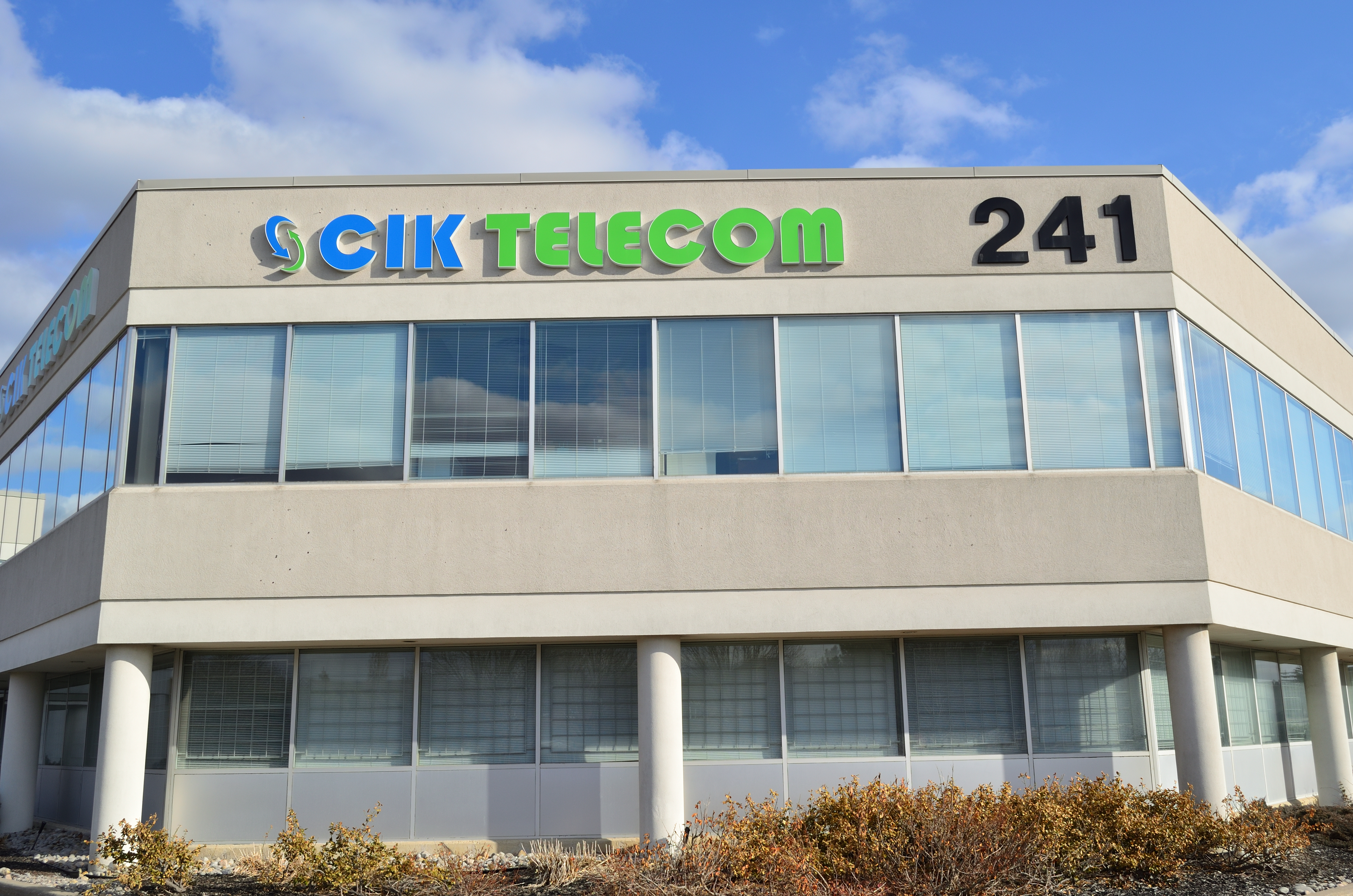
- CIK Head Office
- Type: Private
- Industry: Telecommunications
- Founded: August 2003
- Headquarters: Markham, Ontario, Canada
- Area served: Canada, United States, China, Vietnam, India, and Morocco
- Key people: Jordan Deng (CEO)
- Products: DSL internet, cable internet, fibre to the x, VoIP, cable TVs
- Number of employees: 400 (2017)
- ASN: 54614
- Website: ciktel.com

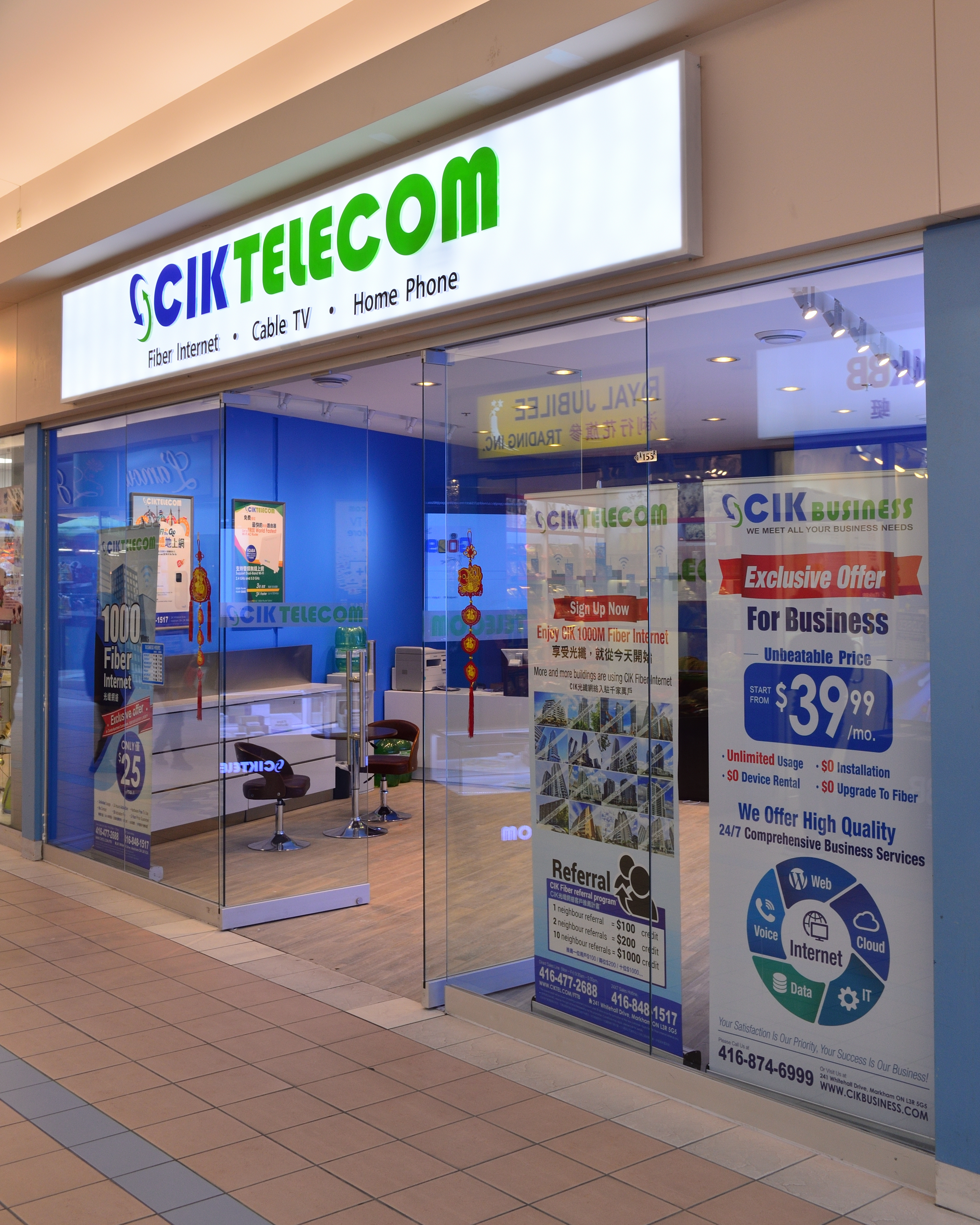
CIK Corporate Store

CIK Telecom is a Canadian telecommunications company based in Toronto, Ontario. CIK Telecom's services are notably geared towards Chinese Canadians and Asian Canadians, but are not limited to them; it offers its services in English, French, and Mandarin.

== History ==
CIK Telecom was founded in 2003 in Toronto by Jordan Deng and Jack Jin.

CIK Telecom is registered as a licensed carrier with the CRTC (Canadian Radio-Television and Telecommunications Commission) since 2003.

In 2014, the company named 25th fastest growing company in the Canada by Canadian Business.

In 2016 and 2017, PC Magazine ranks CIK the 9th fastest ISP in Canada.

In 2017, CIK has over 170,000 subscribers.

CIK Telecom is a member of the Canadian Network Operators Consortium (CNOC).

== Services ==
CIK Telecom is a wholesale-network-access-based service provider, connecting its services from Bell Canada, Rogers Communications, Cogeco, Shaw Communications. It provides DSL, Cable and fibre Internet, VoIP phone services and Cable TV services to residential and business customers.

In 2016, CIK started developing its own fibre optic network in Canada and launched CIK fibre in condominiums in cities across Canada.

== See also ==
- Internet in Canada
