= Everus Communications =

Canadian Internet service provider

- Company type: Private
- Industry: Internet service provider
- Founded: Mount Forest, Ontario (2001)
- Headquarters: Waterloo, Ontario
- Key people: Richard Cantin (President), Twan Peeters (Vice President), John Tinholt (Vice President) and Matthew McMurdie (CFO)
- Products: Wireless internet Dedicated internet Professional services Web hosting DSL Internet; Dial up internet
- Number of employees: 39 (2009)
- Website: Everus.ca

Everus Communications is an Internet service provider based in Holstein, Ontario. It was founded in 2001 as High-Speed FX and offers high speed wireless internet in rural Ontario specifically the south west parts of Ontario. The name was changed to Everus Communications in 2008. In March 2010 Barrett Xplore Inc. purchased the assets of Everus Communications to increase Barrett's coverage in Ontario. In 2012 the Everus towers were decommissioned and all remaining customers were migrated to Xplornet equipment.

== Area covered ==
Currently Everus offers wireless high speed internet in Bruce County, County of Dufferin, County of Wellington, County of Grey, County of County of Perth, County of Oxford, Waterloo County and some surroundings areas.

In November 2008, Everus won the $1 million bid with the County of Grey to initiate the info-structure initiative. The availability of the $1 million as a one third contribution from the province to build $3 million in broadband infrastructure. It is projected that the County will have a 75% chance of access to affordable broadband Internet.

January 2009, Everus also won the $1 million bid with County of Wellington, as well as the County of Dufferin.

== Going Green ==
Everus Communications’ pilot project was a communications tower near the Rocky Saugeen River on Highway 6 near Durham. The solar panel was erected in July 2008 and has exceeded all expectations of the Everus management team. The solar project at the Rocky Saugeen tower site was such a success that another solar powered tower is in the works for residents in Priceville. The solar tower expansion will grow as Everus continues to build new tower sites in Grey and surrounding counties.

As of November 2008, Everus took on the task to start converting supplier and customer invoices from hard copy to electronic copy.

== Controversy ==
Some rural residents had some concerns regarding health risks associated with wireless communications signals. There have been many studies conducted to prove that there are no great risks associated with wireless communications.

The World Health Organization investigated this issue due to persistent public misconceptions about it. They released a report on Electromagnetic fields and public health and their effects on health. Their conclusive findings showed that signal from wireless towers did no harm to health and the common radio signal was 5 times stronger.
