= Epifora (company) =

Canadian internet service provider

Epifora Inc.
- Industry: Internet services
- Defunct: 2007
- Headquarters: Montreal, Canada

Epifora was a Canadian internet service provider based in Montreal.

== History ==
Epifora has hosted a number of websites and chatboards for over a decade prior to 2006. In that same year, the company was cut off from Verizon's services for violating its "acceptable use policy", although a spokesman for Verizon refused to specify the reason for the termination when asked by Xtra Magazine. The company eventually moved to another provider. According to The Gazette, Epifora has hosted blogs by John Robin Sharpe and American blogger Lindsay Ashford. It closed down in 2007.
