= American Iron & Metal =

Canadian waste management company

American Iron & Metal Company Inc.
- Type: Private company
- Founded: 1936
- Founder: Peter Black
- Headquarters: Montreal, Canada
- Key people: Herbert Black (CEO)
- Website: aim-global.com

American Iron & Metal Company Inc. (AIM) is a Canadian recycling company for scrap metal based in Montreal, Quebec. Established in 1936 by Peter Black, it is under private ownership of his family, including Herbert Black, who is the CEO.

== History ==
American Iron & Metal was established in 1936, as a scrapyard in Hochelaga-Maisonneuve, Montreal by Peter Black.

In 2002, AIM established a scrapyard in Saint John, New Brunswick under a 40-year-lease with the Port of Saint John. In 2011, the company spent $30 million to expand its yard. In 2014, the company purchased the Bucksport mill in Bucksport, Maine from paper mill company Verso Corporation, leading to the mill's closure.

== Incidents ==
In 2022, Delsan-AIM, a division of AIM based in Vaughan, Ontario, received a $35,000 fine as a result of a 2019 "demolition-gone-wrong" which resulted in a large dust cloud covering a neighbourhood in Sherman Avenue North.

On July 1, 2022, Darrell Richards, a worker in AIM's Saint John scrapyard, died as a result of a work accident. In 2024, AIM was fined $100,000 for the incident by New Brunswick Provincial Court Judge Claude Haché, and was made to fund a $7,000 scholarship in his name for the New Brunswick Community College.

On the morning of September 14, 2023, a fire was reported at AIM's scrapyard in Saint John, which resulted in thick smoke and haze covering a large part of the city. Following the incident, an investigative task force was made to look into the matter. The company also received a fine for operating without a license at a facility in Moncton. In December 2023, the task force said that "a catastrophic fire similar to that of Sept. 14, 2023, could recur." They also found the scrapyard's location "entirely inappropriate given its now known hazards and risks," given its nearby proximity to several houses in Saint John West.
