= Competitive Network Operators of Canada =

Independent telecommunications providers lobby group

The Competitive Network Operators of Canada (CNOC) (French: Opérateurs de Réseaux Concurrentiels Canadiens (ORCC)) is an organisation of over 30 independent Canadian telecommunications providers. It often lobbies to the CRTC and other regulatory bodies to represent the interest of its members in matter of high-speed Internet accessibility, VoIP industry regulations, anti-monopoly market competitiveness, and privacy of customer information. CNOC's current president and chairman is Paul Andersen, also President of Egate Networks.

== Members ==
As of March 2022, companies which are active CNOC members are:

- ACN Canada
- B2B2C
- City-Wide Communications
- Coextro
- Distributel
- dotmobile
- Egate Networks
- Execulink Telecom
- Fidalia Networks
- InnSys
- ISP Canada
- Kingston Online Services
- LOGIX
- Netcrawler
- Odynet
- Oxio
- Packetworks
- Rally Internet
- Sentex Communications
- SkyChoice Communications
- Start.ca
- Storm Internet
- The Wire Inc.
- Transat Telecom
- VIF Internet
- VMedia
- VSOFT
