= Distributel =

Canadian telecommunications company

- Type: Brand of Bell Canada
- Industry: Telecommunications
- Founded: 1988
- Founder: Mel Cohen
- Headquarters: 801−3300 Bloor Street West, Toronto, Ontario, Canada
- Number of locations: 4 (2016)
- Area served: Canada
- Key people: Matt Stein (CEO)
- Products: High speed Internet; IPTV; VoIP; Long-distance calling
- Number of employees: 300 (2020)
- Parent: Bell Canada
- Subsidiaries: TotalTV, Acanac, Thinktel, Yak, Primus Canada
- Website: distributel.ca

Distributel is a brand of Bell Canada headquartered in Toronto, Ontario, founded in 1988 and offering Canadians long distance phone service. Distributel now offers a wide range of high speed Internet plans in Ontario, Quebec, British Columbia and Alberta as well as VoIP Digital Home Phone service across Canada. Distributel also provides IPTV (Internet Protocol television) in all major markets in Ontario and Quebec.

ThinkTel, the Business Services Division of Distributel, is a provider of SIP-based telecommunications and advanced voice and data services for the SMB and Enterprise markets throughout Canada.

== History ==
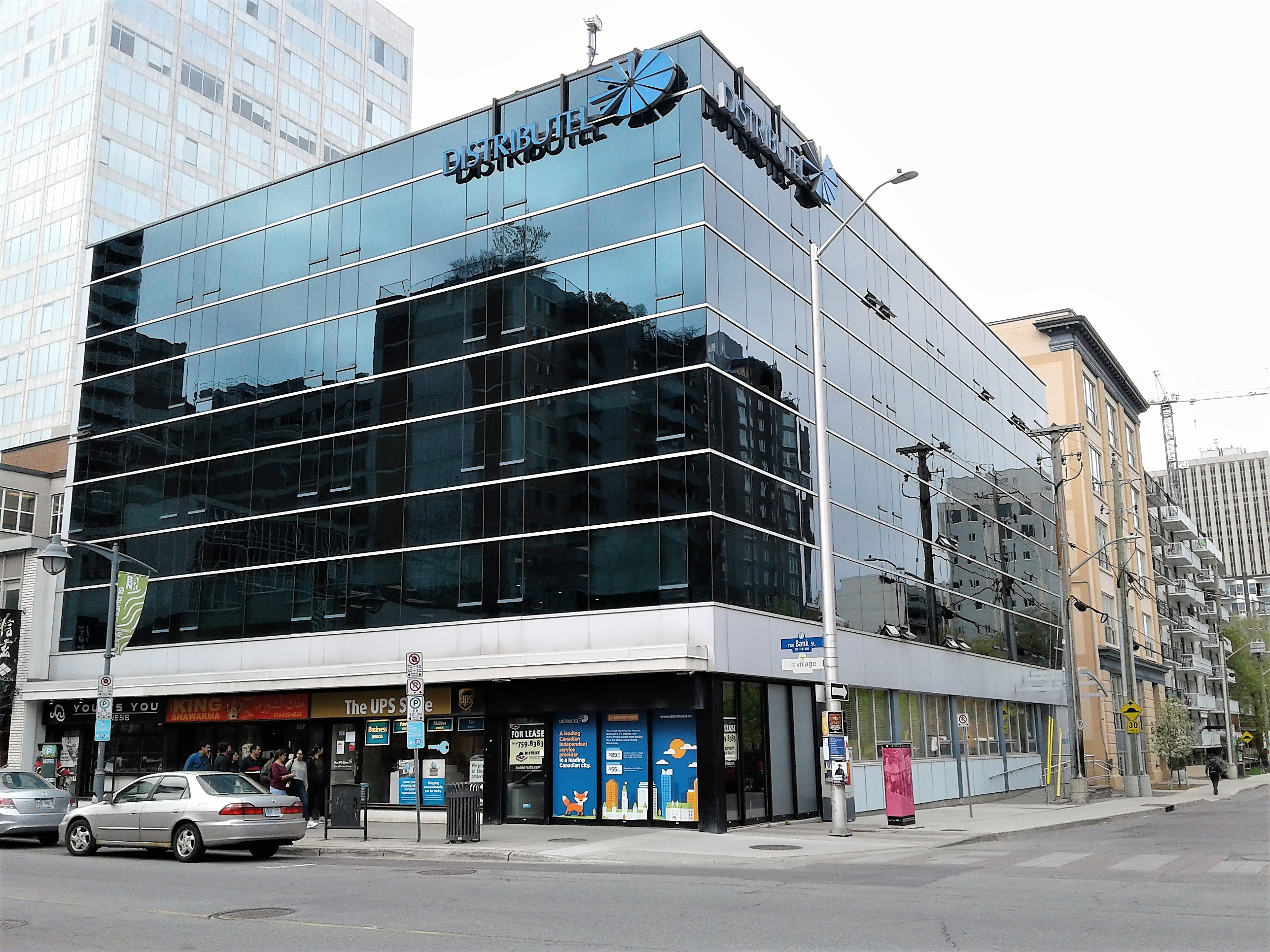
Former headquarters in Ottawa

Founded in 1988 by Mel Cohen, Distributel successfully fought telecommunications giant Bell Canada for the right to offer long-distance services through its network. The Canadian Radio-television and Telecommunications Commission (CRTC) ultimately ruled in favour of Distributel, setting an important precedent for the competitive telecommunications market in Canada.

With over 200,000 subscribers across Canada, Distributel has continued to evolve and expand its business through several key acquisitions and partnerships:

- In 2011, Distributel acquired Acanac Inc., a provider of high-speed Internet and digital home phone (VoIP) services throughout Ontario and Quebec.
- On 31 March 2014, Matt Stein joined Distributel as CEO, while Mel Cohen maintained his role as chairman.
- In September 2016, Distributel acquires Yak Communications from Globalive.
- In January 2017, Distributel announces a partnership with jBilling aimed at providing more flexibility to its business systems.
- In October 2017, Distributel announced the acquisition of selected assets of Teliphone Navigata-Westel Communications (TNW).
- In November 2017, Distributel announced that it had acquired 100% of Zazeen Inc.
- In January 2018, Distributel announced a partnership with Eeyou Communications Network (ECN) to deliver high-speed Internet, home phone and television services to eight communities in the Eeyou Istchee James Bay region in northern Quebec, using a new ECN fibre to the home network.
- On January 19, 2021: Distributel Communications Limited announced that it has acquired Primus Canada.
- In September 2022, Distributel Communications Limited is acquired by Bell and later amalgamated.
  - Bell's purchase agreement with Distributel is worth up to $335M, based on the achievement of certain performance objectives. Bell has earmarked $285M in cash disbursements in 2022, $20M in 2023, and $30M in 2025 for this purchase.

== Services ==
Distributel offers residential telecommunication services: High-speed Internet, digital home Phone, TV and long-distance calling.

=== Cable Internet ===
Distributel provides capped and unlimited cable Internet access via network suppliers Rogers, Videotron, Cogeco and Shaw.

Depending on geographical service area, customers have access to download/upload speeds of:

Geographical service area	Range of speeds - Download/Upload Mbps
Rogers territory in Ontario	From 5/1 Mbit/s up to 250/20 Mbit/s
Cogeco territory in Ontario	From 15/2 Mbit/s up to 250/20 Mbit/s
Videotron territory in Quebec	From 5/1 Mbit/s up to 200/30 Mbit/s
Cogeco territory in Quebec	From 15/2 Mbit/s up to 120/10 Mbit/s
Rogers territory in British Columbia and Alberta	From 5/0.5 Mbit/s up to 60/6 Mbit/s

=== Digital subscriber line (DSL) ===
Distributel provides capped and unlimited digital subscriber line (DSL) and Fibre to the Home (FTTH) high-speed Internet options using Bell lines in Ontario and Quebec while also providing the service via Telus in Alberta and British Columbia.

Depending on the underlying network supplier in their geographical service area, customers have access to download/upload speeds of:

Geographical service area	Range of speeds - Download/Upload Mpbs
Ontario and Quebec (Bell territory)	From 6/1 Mbit/s up to 50/10 Mbit/s
British Columbia and Alberta (Telus territory)	From 6/1 Mbit/s up to 50/10 Mbit/s

=== Television ===
In 2015, Distributel became the first major Canadian independent Internet service provider (ISP) to offer Internet Protocol television (IPTV) in partnership with Zazeen Inc.

To improve its ability to make long-term strategic decisions, continue developing the service and accelerate the introduction of new features and consumer benefits, Distributel acquired 100% of Zazeen Inc. in November 2017. Zazeen channel packages, which must be paired with Distributel unlimited high-speed Internet plans, range from "Starter" to "Ultimate" and are available in most English and French markets in Ontario and Quebec.

=== Telephone and long distance ===
In September 2016, Distributel acquired Yak Communications and proceeded to rebrand its Home Phone product as Yak Digital Home Phone, and retained many service advantages developed by Yak in its integrated offering.

Yak Digital Home Phone is a VoIP service that transfers digital signals via an Internet connection, rather than through a traditional landline. All available packages include unlimited local calling and 12 calling features. Various plans offered include long distance minutes.

== CNOC membership ==
Distributel is a member of the Competitive Network Operators of Canada (CNOC) and CEO Matt Stein was the vice-chair and spokesperson for CNOC between 2020 and 2022.

== Open Media ==
Until its purchase by Bell Media, Distributel was a Gold sponsor of Open Media.

== See also ==
- EBOX
