= Cablevision (Canada) =

Canadian cable TV and Internet service provider

- Company type: Subsidiary
- Industry: Telecommunications
- Founded: 1957
- Headquarters: Val-d'Or, Quebec, Canada
- Number of employees: 50 (2008)
- Parent: BCE Inc.
- Website: cablevision.qc.ca

Cablevision du Nord de Québec, doing business as Cablevision, is a cable television and Internet service provider in Canada. The company predominantly serves the Abitibi-Témiscamingue area, though it serves other parts of Quebec as well. Cablevision's offices are in Val-d'Or, Quebec.

In 2001, Cablevision was acquired by Telebec (which was subsequently bought by Bell Canada).

== See also ==
- List of internet service providers in Canada
