= History of Telus =

This is a timeline of Telus Corporation (also referred to as Telus Corp.), a publicly traded Canadian multinational holding company offering a range of telecommunications, health, safety, and security products and services. The company operates Telus Communications Inc., which offers telephony, television, data and Internet services, Telus Mobility, a division that offers wireless services, Telus Health, which operates companies that provide health products and services, and Telus International which operates worldwide, providing multilingual customer service outsourcing and digital IT services. (Note: According to Bloomberg, TELUS Corporation is "TELUS Corporation is a telecommunications company providing a variety of communications products and services. The Company provides voice, data, Internet, and wireless services to businesses and consumers in Canada.")

In 2014, Bell Canada, Rogers Communications, Telus, Shaw Communications (which merged with Rogers in 2023), and Quebecor Media—the "Big Five"—were the largest telecommunications companies in Canada, in that order. The "Big 5" had become "enormous media conglomerates" active across Canada in many "telecoms, media and internet markets" with "mobile wireless and internet access.".

== Timeline ==
1990

- In June, then Premier of Alberta, Don Getty announced his intention to privatize the Crown corporation—Alberta Government Telephones (AGT).
- In September, the Calgary-based NovAtel Communications Ltd., that former premier Peter Lougheed had established, reported a loss of $4 million "instead of earning $16.9 million as it had predicted". Neldner fired NovAtel's executives. " In a bid to save the privatization effort, Alberta negotiated with investors promising to "cover the shortfall in NovAtel’s earnings" for 1990. As well, the Getty administration "gave Telus the right to sell NovAtel back to the province by Dec. 31, 1991." A December 1990 Maclean's article described the incident as another "setback in Alberta's drive to become a high-tech centre. Helmut Neldner, who began his career in various positions at AGT starting in 1964, was AGT's president in 1983 and Chief Executive Officer from 1984 to 1987. When AGT was privatized and acquired by Edmonton, Alberta based-Telus Corp, Neldner became Edmonton, Alberta based-Telus Corp's president and CEO. (Note: Neldner also served as on the boards of utility companies—ATCO Ltd., Canadian Utilities Limited, Alberta Power Limited, CU Power International Limited, and the manufacturing company—ATCO Structures Inc.)
- In October 1990, Telus Corp. acquired AGT for $951 million—representing the "largest single stock offering in Canadian history."

1991

- The "Government of Alberta sold its remaining shares of Telus for CA$870 million".

1993

- Josh Blair joined Telus and served in various leadership roles until 2018.

1995

Telus Corporation acquires Edmonton Telephones (ED TEL Inc) from the city of Edmonton Alberta for CA$467 million.

1996

In their 2003, report Telus said that their approach to the market is to work as a "united team, under one brand" a "single", "consistent" TELUS "identity", to contrast with "confusing corporate structures and brand proliferation" and to avoid the duplication of "resources and expertise". The brands ED TEL and AGT were retired in 1996. TELUS, capitalized, refers to either Telus Corporation or Telus Communications.

1997

On May 8, TELUS Cable Holdings Inc. (TELUS), won Canadian Radio-television and Telecommunications Commission (CRTC) approval under the Broadcasting Act and the Telecommunications Act, to start multimedia service trials in Edmonton and Calgary.

1998

- October 26, 1998 In Victoria, British Columbia, Telus was incorporated under the British Columbia Company Act as BCT.TELUS Communications Inc (BCT)—a "Telecommunications company with a "[n]ational network of long distance, Internet and wireless networks and telephone equipment." Edmonton, Alberta was listed as its secondary address

1999

- January 31, 1999 The former Alberta-based TELUS Corporation (TC), among BCT, BC TELECOM Inc. (“BC TELECOM”) and BCT acquired all of the shares of BC TELECOM and TC in exchange for Common Shares and Non-Voting Shares of BCT, and BC TELECOM was dissolved. under the Canada Business Corporations Act

On 21 January 1999, BC Telecom shareholders, upon the unanimous recommendation of its board of directors overwhelmingly voted to merge with Telus Corporation who had earlier in the week on 19 January 1999 received similar approval from its shareholders. The US based carrier GTE who had owned 56% of BC Telecom would retain 26% of the new company. The merger was worth CA$8 billion, had a combined work force of 25,000 employees, and created Canada's second largest telecommunications company behind Bell Canada. This effectively may have been the precipitous that would redraw the map for Canada telecommunications industry, which until now had major players who were part of the Stentor Alliance and constricted within their traditional provincial boundaries and facing increasing outside pressures brought upon them by the industry's deregulation. Initially the merger was registered as BCT.Telus Communications Inc. and later the new company adopted the Telus name and moved its corporate offices to BC Tel's former headquarters in Vancouver, British Columbia.

2000

- May 3 BCT.TELUS COMMUNICATIONS INC. completed a Certificate of Name Change to TELUS Corporation.
- in July, Darren Entwistle became president and CEO of Telus Communications Co, a position he continued to hold in June 2020. According to Bloomberg, Entwistle was also named as president and CEO of Telus Corporation in July 2000, a position he held until May 2014.
- On October 19, "Telus Corp. of Burnaby, B.C." completed its acquisition of the "Toronto-based wireless provider" Clearnet Communications Inc. for $6.6-billion in cash and stock, according to the Globe and Mail. This "catapulted" Telus Corporation from a "regional provider to the national stage" Telus Mobility—a division of the company's wholly owned subsidiary, Telus Communication, acquired the "largest block of available wireless spectrum in Canada" at that time, "serving approximately 700,000 users."

2004

- May 2004 Verizon Communications, Inc. informed the Telus Corporation board that it wanted to sell its 21% minority stake in Telus. In December 2004, Verizon sold its share to institutional investors for an estimated value of CA$2.3 billion. Under the terms of the agreement, Verizon paid Telus a non-refundable fee of US$125 million, and agreed to let Telus continue to have exclusive rights to the Verizon trademarks in Canada, and to software and technology it had acquired under an existing relationship. Verizon also agreed to provide Telus with upgrades and support for software and technology it had licensed which allowed seamless single-rate roaming across North America. Both companies said they would continue their business relationship and a co-operation with respect to the sharing of cross-border services. The terms of the agreement also released Telus from its non-compete obligation against Verizon in the United States.

2005

- Telus Corp merged TELUS Communications and TELUS Mobility into "one operating structure."
- November 2005 Telus Corp commercially launched TELUS TV, beginning with neighbourhoods in two cities in Alberta—Edmonton and Calgary.

2007

- December 2007 '6886116 Canada Ltd., which was an indirect wholly owned subsidiary of Telus Corporation, offered to purchase for cash all the common shares of Emergis Inc. for CA$8.25 each. The offer to purchase all of the outstanding common shares was completed on 17 January 2008 for CA$763 million. The company was rebranded to Telus Health and divided into three segments; Telus Health Solutions, Telus Assyst Real Estate, and Telus Financial Solutions.
- December 31, 2007 According to the 2008 SEC EDGAR form—based on sales generated, operating revenues, and consolidated assets, Telus Communications Inc. (TCI) was Telus Corporations' "only material subsidiary" at that time.

2008

- March 2008 Telus Corporation launched a new discount new cellphone brand —Koodo Mobile which targets youth.
- March 14 The compulsory "TELUS Corporation Annual Information Form" was submitted to the U.S. Securities and Exchange Commission (SEC).

2011

In April 2011, Telus Corporation re-introduced Clearnet as a discount brand in Western Canada.

2012

In June 2012, Telus Corporation decided to stop activating customers under the Clearnet brand.

2013

In October 2013, Telus Corporation received Industry Canada approval to purchase Public Mobile, acquiring 280,000 customers in Ontario and Quebec.

2014

In March 2014, Telus Corporation made the decision to shutdown Public Mobile stating the need to move its customers from an outdated network and to ensure the survival of its brand. The move would anger affected customers who would need to purchase new cellphones to migrate onto the Telus 4G network, and would create further criticism from consumer advocates and further fuel the ongoing debate about the lack of competition in the industry in Canada.

2014 In a 2014 report by the Canadian Media Concentration Research Project (CMCRP), Telus ranked third with 15.9 percent of media market share, out of the 5 largest telecommunications companies in Canada, along with Bell Canada (BCE) with 27.9 percent, Rogers Communications 16.4 percent, Shaw Communications 7.8 percent, and Quebecor Media 5.3 percent. Their combined revenues account for 73.3 percent of all telecommunications revenues in Canada. According to the CMCRP, the "Big 5" "have built enormous media conglomerates that have a reach across many telecoms, media and internet markets across Canada" with "mobile wireless and internet access" as their "nucleus" or "pipes".

2015

- in August, Joe Natale, who led Telus Corporation as CEO since 2014, while residing in Toronto, announced he was stepping down because he did not want to move to Vancouver, where Telus is headquartered. (Note: CBC described Telus as the "Vancouver-based telecom conglomerate".) Telus" is stepping down from the job because he does not want to live in Western Canada. Entwistle, the ex-CEO replaced Natale.

2017

In October 2017, Telus International announced that it had signed a deal to initially purchase a 65% stake in Xavient Information Systems, an information technology consulting firm headquartered in California, with the right to acquire the remaining interest on or before 31 December 2020 for a total of US$250 million. At the time Xavient had a workforce of 8,000 employees located in the United States and India.

2018

- In January 2018, Telus Corporation announced that it had acquired the AlarmForce operations and assets for Western Canada only, for approximately CA$66.5 million from BCE Inc.
- In August 2018, Telus Health announced it had purchased 30 elite medical clinics which operate under the Medisys, Copeman Healthcare and Horizon Occupational Health Solutions brands across Canada for over CA$100 million.
- On June 26, 2018, TELUS announced that Josh Blair, who had been with TELUS since 1993 in various leadership roles, was resigning at the end of 2018. Blair remained as Chair of TELUS International and would become a Chair Emeritus of TELUS Health. He had served since 2006 "as a member of the company’s executive leadership team Group President and Chief Corporate Officer.
- On its official 2018 web page, TELUS said it was a "communications and information technology company with $14.6 billion in annual revenue and 14.2 million customer connections spanning wireless, data, IP, voice, television, entertainment, video and security...TELUS Health is Canada's largest healthcare IT provider." "TELUS International provides "business process solutions".

2019

- August 2019 Telus Corporation announced that it had purchased Farm At Hand, a farm management platform that allows farmers to track and manage farm inventory. The company was branded as "Farm AT Hand driven by TELUS".
- August 2019, it was announced that Telus Health had a deal to acquire the virtual health platform Akira Health which offers a healthcare app, as well as in-person healthcare clinics. The terms of the deal were not disclosed.
- October 2019 Telus Corporation announced that it had entered into an agreement to purchase the Canadian operations and assets of ADT Inc., a US-based company, owned by equity firm Apollo Global Management for approximately US$527 million (CA$700 million). It was announced in November 2019 that the transaction had been completed, adding to the company approximately 500,000 customers and a workforce of approximately 1,000 employees across Canada. The company was branded "ADT by TELUS".
- December 2019 Telus Corporation acquired the Alberta-based Decisive Farming, a company dedicated to increasing farming profitability, sustainability, and technology ease-of-use with a single integrated platform for the farm's primary operating system. This was the second Telus Corp agriculture acquisition. Financial terms were not disclosed. The company was branded "Decisive Farming driven by TELUS".
- December 2019 Telus Corporation announced that it would acquire a 100% stake in Competence Call Center (CCC) for approximately CA$1.3 billion (consisting of debt and equity) through its subsidiary Telus International, growing the subsidiary to about 50,000 workers. The acquisition was completed on February 4, 2020.
- December 2019 Telus Health announced that it had acquired DirectAlert in Quebec, and expansion of its LivingWell Personal Medical Alert Services (PERS).

2020

- February 4, 2020 President and CEO of TELUS, Darren Entwistle, announced that Telus International, TELUS Corporation's "international arm" completed its acquisition of Competence Call Center (CCC). CCC which was founded in the late 1990s, has 8,500 CCC employees in 11 European countries.
- September 2002, Telus acquired AFS Technologies and Exceedra Software, which AFS had acquired previously, as part of plan to digitizing the consumer goods industry. In November Telus announced that these companies together with 5 others would form their new Telus Agriculture division.

2026

- In March 2026, a notorious cyber crime group known as ShinyHunters claimed to several high-profile news agencies that they stole over 1 petabyte (PB) of data from Telus & Telus Digital.
- The group demanded a staggering $65 million dollar ransom in exchange for not leaking the company's data.
- The stolen data according to multiple prominent media outlets like Reuters and Bloomberg included ‌information related to more than two dozen companies that included personally identifiable information, call data and recordings (CDRs), FBI background check information, financial information, Salesforce data, and source code spanning multiple business divisions within the business services and telecommunications company. The stolen data also reportedly impacts Telus' telecommunication services; customers and call logs.

== See also ==
- Alberta Government Telephones(AGT)
- Telus Health
- Telus Mobility
- Telus International
