= Telus =

Telus may refer to:

- Telus Corporation, a Canadian publicly traded holding company
  - Telus Communications, a telecommunications company
  - Telus Digital, a technology company
  - Telus Health, a health technology provider
  - Telus Mobility, a mobile network operator

== See also ==
- History of Telus
- Tellus (disambiguation)
