= Exceedra Software =

Defunct British software company

- Formerly: Cube Software
- Company type: Privately held company
- Industry: Enterprise software
- Founded: 1986
- Defunct: September 2020
- Fate: Acquired
- Successor: Telus Corporation
- Headquarters: London, United Kingdom
- Area served: Worldwide
- Products: TELUS Trade Promotion Management and TELUS Retail Execution systems
- Website: telus.com/agcg

Exceedra Software was a British software company producing integrated business planning and analytics software. The company was acquired by Canadian based Telus Corporation in 2020.

After its acquisition, the company's three main software products were woven into existing Telus offerings, Telus Consumer Goods, Telus Retail Execution, and Telus Trade Promotion Management systems.

== History ==
Exceedra Software, formally known as Cube Software, provided integrated business planning and optimization analysis systems to improve performance in trade promotion management for consumer packaged goods companies. Prior to being acquired by TELUS Agriculture and Consumer Goods in 2020, the company was headquartered in London, United Kingdom with offices located in Marlow Buckinghamshire; Charlotte North Carolina, United States and Melbourne, Australia. It was an award-winning, multinational organization.

Established in 1986, Exceedra equipped fast moving consumer goods companies with advanced sales and distribution capabilities. The company achieved critical acclaim. It was listed in The Guardian newspaper's Top Tech 100 list in 2011, and The telegraph newspaper's Start Up 100 list in 2011. It won Consumer Goods Technology's 2016 Readers' Choice Survey: Supply Chain Planning award.

== Timeline ==
- In 1986, Exceedra introduced Procast – a demand forecasting application, as part of a joint venture with Unilever. The product became commercially available the following year. IT became available internationally across in the retail, consumer goods, manufacturing, wholesale distribution and pharmaceutical sectors.
- In 2009, Exceedra developed ActNow – a demand sensing application that added intelligence to demand planning software.
- In 2010, Exceedra became a Microsoft BizSpark One Company.
- In 2010, Exceedra changed the name of Procast to Sales Planner and Demand Planner.
- After 2013, Exceedra expanded globally, opening offices in the United States and Australia.
- In 2013, Exceedra placed 8th in the Cloudex 20:20– a listing of the top 20 U.K. independent cloud computing companies.
- In 2014, Exceedra was recognized by Gartner in its report “Vendor Panorama for Trade Promotion Management in Consumer Goods, 2014.”
- In 2015, Exceedra was listed in the Top 10 Technology Providers for Trade Promotion Management and as a leader of the SMB category in Consumer Goods Technology (CGT) Readers’ Choice 2015 awards.
- In 2019, Exceedra merged with AFS. The combined company operated as a subsidiary of AFS Technologies under the Exceedra name.
- In 2020, Exceedra was acquired by TELUS Agriculture and Consumer Goods. Its software was woven into two products delivered through TELUS Consumer Goods: TELUS Trade Promotion Management and TELUS Retail Execution.

== Products ==
- Telus Consumer Goods were incorporated into TELUS Agriculture and Consumer Goods equips consumer product goods (CPG) companies providing primarily digital tools and technology, designed to unlock existing data. This enables these businesses to optimize their workflows, investments and operations and be more strategic, efficient and profitable.
- Telus Trade Promotion Management provided Consumer Packaged Goods companies with tools to optimize their trade promotion strategy, planning and management across retail and foodservice channels. The trade promotion management software provideed tools designed to improve profitability, visibility, agility and responsiveness. TELUS Trade Promotion Management helps CPG manufacturers reduce trade spend waste, increase efficiency and decrease risk.
- Telus Retail Execution automated point of sale (POS) interactions. Manufacturers can also use it to monitor compliance, manage inventory and execute promotional tactics.

== See also ==
- Sales and operations planning
- Trade Promotion Management
