= Telecommunications Workers Union =

TWU1944-2014
- Telecommunications Workers Union 1944-2014
- Merged into: United Steelworkers
- Founded: Sept 1,1944
- Dissolved: December 31, 2014
- Headquarters: Burnaby, British Columbia
- Location: Canada
- Affiliations: CLC

The Telecommunications Workers Union (TWU) was a trade union in Canada for people working for telephone and cable companies. Although the TWU had members from Shaw Cable in the Vancouver area of British Columbia, Canada, the majority of TWU members were employees of Telus. It was founded on September 1, 1944, and existed until December 31, 2014. In November 2014 the members voted to join the United Steel workers of America (the second vote in a year to be held as the first vote failed). Per the merger agreement the independent status of the Union which had represented Telecommunications Workers in Canada for over 70 years came to an end. The new local is known as "Telecommunications Workers Union, United Steelworkers Local 1944" and is a local of the United Steel Workers of America an 860,000 member union.

== Telus 2005 labour dispute ==
The union's labour dispute with Canadian telecommunications firm Telus began after their previous contract negotiated with Telus' predecessor BCTel before the two merged expired at the end of 2000. On April 12, 2005, Telus made its last offer to the TWU, and on July 12, Telus informed the TWU of its intention to bring an end to the dispute by unilaterally implementing its April offer to employees in Alberta and British Columbia, effective on July 22. The TWU was locked out on July 21.

A tentative agreement was reached on October 10, 2005. On October 30, 2005, union membership voted against ratification, with 50.3% of voting members voting against the contract. A second tentative agreement was reached with a mail-out ballot, and on November 18, 2005, the contract was ratified with 64.1% support, ending the dispute.

== Merger with USW ==
In a referendum vote counted November 7, 2014, the members of the Telecommunications Workers Union voted to join the United Steelworkers (USW). The merger agreement took formal effect on January 1, 2015. About 42% of the total membership of 12,500 voted. The result of those who voted "yes" was 73.8%, which amounted to approximately 30% of the entire membership.

== See also ==
- United Steelworkers
- List of trade unions

== Sources ==
- Bernard, Elaine (1982). The Long Distance Feeling: A History of the Telecommunications Workers Union. Vancouver: New Star Books. ISBN 978-0-919573-02-4.
