= Telus Mobility =

Canadian telecommunications company

- Formerly: AGT Mobility
- Type: Division
- Industry: Mobile network operator
- Founded: 1983; 43 years ago in Edmonton, Alberta, Canada
- Headquarters: Vancouver, British Columbia, Canada
- Products: Feature phones, mobile broadband modems, smartphones (Android, BlackBerry OS, iOS, Windows Phone), tablet computers
- Services: UMTS (including HSPA+), LTE, 5G NR, mobile broadband, SMS, telephony
- Parent: Telus
- Website: www.telus.com/en/mobility

Telus Mobility is a Canadian wireless network operator and a division of Telus Communications which sells Wireless services in Canada on its network. It operates 5G+, 5G, LTE, HSPA+, and LPWA on its network. Telus Mobility is the third-largest wireless carrier in Canada, with 10.1 million subscribers as of Q2 2024.

Since 2008, Telus has operated a flanker brand named Koodo Mobile, which is targeted at high school, college and university students. And since October 23, 2013, Telus has operated the self-serve mobile brand Public Mobile, which since February 2015, has been operated as a "bring your own phone" value brand.

== History ==
=== 1980s ===
In 1983, AGT Mobility was formed by Alberta Government Telephones (the predecessor to Telus) to provide a 1G analogue mobile network for Alberta's natural resources industries. It was the first mobile phone network in Canada. Analogue services became available to the general public in 1986.

=== 1990s ===
In 1992, AGT launched North America's first digital mobile network. Following the merger of Telus with BC Tel in 1999, Telus Mobility expanded its coverage to British Columbia. The company's website went online on October 14, 1999. The following year, Telus acquired Clearnet Communications and QuébecTel to expand its coverage to the central provinces. All these acquisitions, along with a tower-sharing agreement with then-primarily Eastern Canada based Bell Mobility, allowed Telus Mobility to offer its CDMA network in all Canadian provinces. Bell and Telus continued their partnership for future network construction.

=== 2000s ===
In 2007, Telus Mobility launched mobile virtual network operator (MVNO) Amp'd Mobile Canada, but replaced it in 2008 with Koodo Mobile

In February 2008, Telus Mobility discontinued its AMPS analog network, and launched its HSPA+ network in November 2009. Telus offered landlines to customers affected by the AMPS network's shutdown in rural areas, as digital signals are less reliable than analog ones in such areas. Following both events, Telus began a slow phasing out of CDMA devices, especially those that support both AMPS and CDMA technologies.

=== 2010s ===
In February 2012, Telus launched its LTE network and it stopped selling CDMA devices, except those on clearance.

In 2013, Telus was approved by the Canadian government to purchase independent wireless carrier Public Mobile.

On August 8, 2014, Telus shut down Public Mobile's CDMA network after informing customers that they would need to buy phones compatible with Telus' network.

On March 31, 2015, Telus shut down its pager network.

On January 29, 2016, Telus shut down its Mike iDEN network.

On May 31, 2017, Telus shut down its CDMA network.

=== 2020s ===
In November 2026, Quebecor made an unsolicited bid to purchase Telus in a cash and stock deal worth ~$22 billion. Telus CEO, Victor Dodig—who took the job in July 2026—suggested the deal undervalued Telus, and that Telus' fiber assets alone were worth the proposed price tag.

== Networks ==
Telus Mobility partners with Bell Mobility to operate three different kinds of nationwide networks in Canada. These networks include a UMTS network, an LTE network and a 5G network. Telus has the fastest mobile network in Canada as of 2020 according to Speedtest.net.

=== UMTS ===
On November 5, 2009, Telus launched HSPA+ services the day after Bell launched the services on their network; much of the 3G infrastructure is shared between the two carriers. While this network used to operate on the frequencies of 850/1900 MHz, it currently is only active on 1900 MHz.

The HSPA+ network will shut down in Manitoba on March 31, 2026, and a nationwide shutdown will occur on March 1, 2027.

Telus' single-channel 21 Mbit/s HSPA+ network is available to 97% of the Canadian population.

Telus' HSPA+ network coverage is in portions of all Canadian provinces and territories, but it is not possible to drive across Canada between the Pacific coast and the Atlantic coast without going through areas that do not have any cellular coverage, as there are gaps in cellular coverage in British Columbia and Ontario.

=== LTE ===
LTE service for Telus launched on February 10, 2012, through a partnership with Bell. Telus advertises this network as having download speeds of up to 110 Mbit/s and its LTE Advanced network as having download speeds up to 225 Mbit/s.

As of August 2016, LTE coverage reached most of Canada's population, but there are gaps in coverage in smaller communities and between communities, where Telus' HSPA+ network is available, but its LTE network is not available. Steinbach, MB (population 13,500) is the largest Canadian community without LTE coverage from Telus. Except near Canada's largest metropolitan areas, contiguous LTE coverage does not exist between communities.

Bell Mobility, which shares towers and coverage with Telus, intended to expand LTE coverage to 98% of the Canadian population by the end of 2016. As a consequence, Telus' coverage will similarly expand. In April 2015, Telus announced that all of its wireless sites in British Columbia and Alberta would be upgraded to LTE. According to Telus, as of March 31, 2016, it had LTE coverage available 97% of the Canadian population and LTE Advance coverage available to 50% of the Canadian population.

In May 2016, Telus announced that by the end of the year, it would expand its coverage to 99% of British Columbians and expand its LTE coverage to 98% of British Columbians, expand its LTE coverage to 99% of Albertans, and expand its LTE coverage to 99% of Ontarians.

On April 18, 2016, Telus launched Voice over LTE (VoLTE). VoLTE is supported throughout Canada.

=== Radio frequency summary ===
Frequencies used on the Telus Mobility Network
Frequency range	Band number	Protocol	Class	Status	Note(s)
1.9 GHz PCS	2	UMTS/HSDPA/HSPA+	3G	Active	Covers all urban, and rural areas where LTE is unavailable. $3 monthly charge for using 3G-only devices. Network to be decommissioned in Manitoba by March 31, 2026. Network to be decommissioned nationwide by March 1, 2027.
600 MHz DD	71	LTE/LTE-A/LTE-A Pro	4G	Active / being deployed	Mainly used in rural areas / rural coverage. Also being used to provide LTE Advanced coverage.
700 MHz SMH A/B/C/E	12/13/17/29	LTE/LTE-A/LTE-A Pro	4G	Active / being deployed	Mainly used in rural areas / rural coverage.
850 MHz CLR	5/26	LTE/LTE-A/LTE-A Pro	4G	Active / being deployed	Used for extra bandwidth within cities and rural coverage.
1.7/2.1 GHz AWS	4/66	LTE/LTE-A/LTE-A Pro	4G	Active / being deployed	Main LTE Band used across the country. Also being used to provide LTE Advanced coverage.
1.9 GHz PCS	2/25	LTE/LTE-A/LTE-A Pro	4G	Active / being deployed	Secondary LTE Band being deployed and used for LTE / LTE Advanced coverage.
2.6 GHz IMT-E	7	LTE/LTE-A/LTE-A Pro	4G	Active / being deployed	Found in select markets, but being developed slowly in new markets alongside to provide LTE Advanced coverage.
5.2 GHz U-NII	46	LTE/LTE-A/LTE-A Pro	4G	Active / being deployed	License assisted access (LAA). Additional capacity in select cities.
600 MHz DD	n71	NR	5G	Active / being deployed	NSA (Non-Standalone) Mode; Being actively deployed in several markets alongside n78.
850 MHz CLR	n5	NR	5G	Active / being deployed	NSA (Non-Standalone) Mode
1.7/2.1 GHz Extended AWS	n66	NR	5G	Active / being deployed	NSA (Non-Standalone) Mode; Secondary NR band.
1.9 GHz PCS	n25	NR	5G	Active / being deployed	NSA (Non-Standalone) Mode; Secondary NR band.
3.7 GHz C-Band	n77/n78	NR	5G	Active / being deployed	NSA (Non-Standalone) Mode; active since June 2022.

== Products ==
Telus Mobility currently carries iPhone and Android smartphones, plus the ZTE Cymbal 2 feature phone. These types of smartphones were added to the Telus lineup on November 5, 2009, coinciding with the carrier's launch of its 3G HSPA network. Since the launch of its 5G NR network in 2020, all devices sold by Telus are compatible with its 4G LTE network, and most smartphones are also compatible with its 5G network.

Former devices sold by Telus generally used deprecated network technologies: 3G CDMA and HSPA/HSPA+, 2G CDMA and 1G AMPS. Of these, only the HSPA and HSPA+ networks remain in operation. In contrast to Verizon and Sprint in the United States, Telus did not offer CDMA service with its iPhone and Android devices. Telus formerly carried devices with the BlackBerry, webOS and Windows operating systems, which are no longer supported.

== Services ==
=== Voice ===
Telus Mobility sells a variety of voice plans. These include a fixed number of minutes plus unlimited calling on weeknights, weekends and with up to four other Telus lines on the same account. Caller ID and a basic voicemail for up to three messages are also included as calling features, although airtime is charged for accessing the latter. All voice plans except for the least expensive one also allow the choice of one additional feature: double minutes, five favourite numbers or unlimited Canada-wide SMS/MMS messaging. For the five favourite numbers, unlimited calling is available in either local or Canada-wide options while messaging to these numbers is Canada-wide.

Partners Skype and Telehop offer long-distance services for Telus Mobility customers. The first service uses Voice over IP (VoIP) and requires a mobile broadband connection, while the latter uses traditional telephony through the dialing code No. 100. The Telehop service, which deducts minutes when used during weekdays, cannot be use for calls terminating in Canada or the United States.

=== Mobile Internet ===
Telus offers several Internet-only and smartphone plans and add-ons for customers wishing to access mobile broadband. Only one plan can be added per device, and certain plans are only available for certain devices.

=== Mobile payment ===
Telus Mobility postpaid customers with a compatible smartphone can subscribe to Skype (and formerly also Rdio) and be billed for the service on their monthly bill. Use of either service on the Telus Mobility network requires a subscription to one of the provider's data plans or add-ons.

== Controversy ==
=== Sale of pornography ===
In 2007, Telus Mobility began selling in-house pay-per-download pornographic entertainment, including explicit pictures and videos, via its phones. Industry analysts described the action, the first by a North American wireless company, as a landmark move. However, the company later discontinued sales of such content in response to objections from religious groups.

=== Incoming text message fee ===
In July 2008, Telus Mobility and Bell Mobility simultaneously introduced charges of 15¢ for every incoming text message received by all customers not subscribed to a text messaging plan. Critics were quick to point out that there is no way of blocking incoming message fees and suggested Telus and Bell were price fixing as both had announced the fees simultaneously. Both companies have been sued by frustrated consumers and subscribers, as they demand change in text charges. Many customers were frustrated because this fee also applies to existing customers with ongoing contracts. As of 2014, the only plans in which Telus and Bell charge per message (either outgoing or incoming) are pay-per-use prepaid plans. All monthly rate plans include at least unlimited text messaging to numbers within Canada. Additionally in a 2014 press release, Telus stated that charges elicited from unwanted spam text messages can be waived at the customer's request.

== Philanthropy ==
From 2008 to 2011 inclusively, Telus Mobility sold pink BlackBerry phones where a portion of each sale would support breast cancer research. This included the BlackBerry Curve and the BlackBerry Pearl consumer models. In 2012, Telus introduced a new campaign entitled "$25 for Free the Children" to replace the breast cancer campaign. For every purchase of the Samsung Galaxy S III or the Samsung Galaxy Ace Q, Telus will donate $25 to Free the Children, up to a maximum of $650,000. Both phones include a We Day–themed gel skin to fit the respective phone purchased.

== Retail presence ==
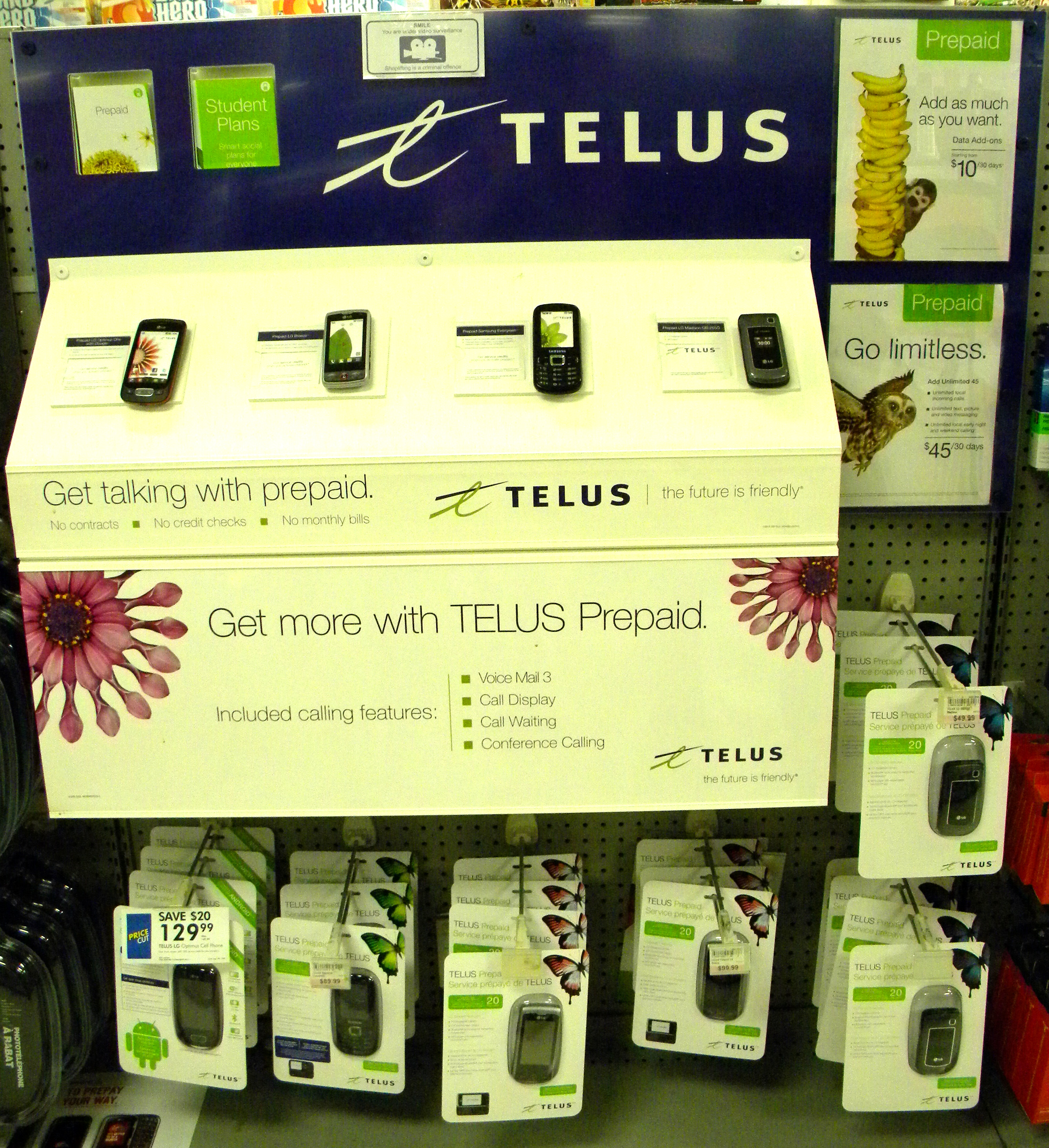
Prepaid Telus phones

Telus Mobility has its own corporate retail stores and also allows third parties to become exclusive dealers. Best Buy, Walmart and selected Loblaws stores in Canada provide Telus products, prepaid and/or postpaid services.

The Loblaws PC Telecom mobile virtual network operator repackages a mix of Bell prepaid and Telus postpaid services; some stores also offer handsets and prepaid minutes under the original network banners.

== See also ==
- Clearnet, a mobile virtual network operator launched in 2011 by Telus Mobility using the Clearnet brand name
- List of Canadian mobile phone companies
- Telus Corporation, parent of Telus Communications
