= Telus Corporation =

Canadian multinational corporation

- Logo used since 1996

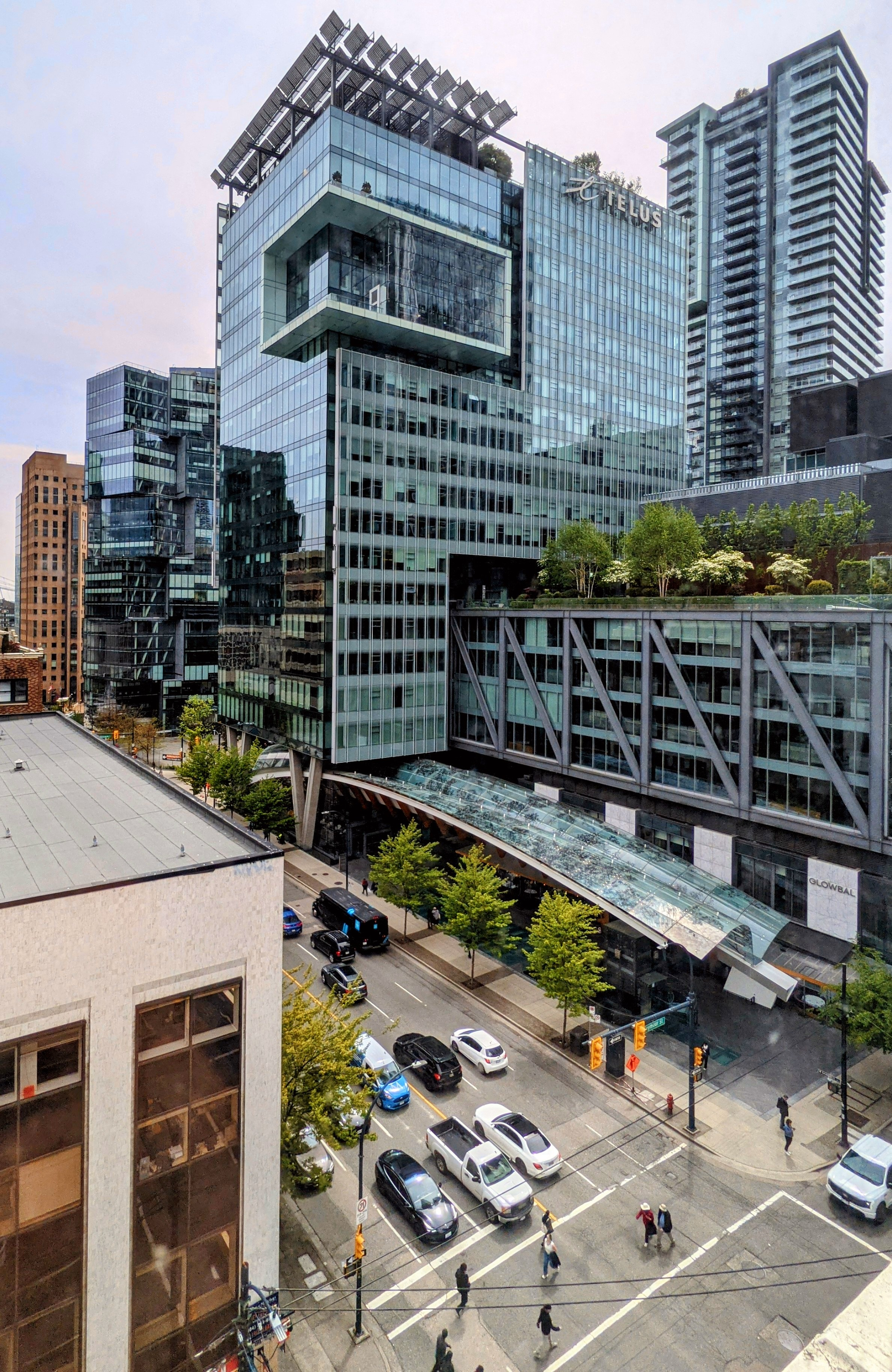
- Telus Garden, headquarters in Vancouver
- Type: Public
- Traded as: TSX: T (voting); NYSE: TU; S&P/TSX 60 component
- ISIN: CA87971M1032
- Industry: Telecommunications Information Technology Consulting Health Safety Security Agriculture
- Predecessor: Alberta Government Telephones (AGT) and British Columbia Telephone Company (BC Tel)
- Founded: 1990; 36 years ago in Edmonton, Alberta, Canada
- Headquarters: 510 West Georgia Street, Vancouver, British Columbia, Canada
- Area served: Worldwide
- Key people: Victor Dodig (CEO); Gopi Chande (CFO)
- Products: HSPA+, LTE, 5G
- Revenue: ▲CA$20.51 billion (2025)
- Operating income: ▼CA$2.36 billion (2025)
- Net income: ▼CA$777 millions (2025)
- Total assets: ▲CA$59.61 billions (2025)
- Number of employees: ▲111,500 (2025)
- Subsidiaries: Telus Communications; Telus Mobility; Telus Health; Telus Digital; Telus Agriculture
- Website: www.telus.com

Telus Corporation (also shortened and referred to as Telus Corp, and stylized as TELUS) is a Canadian publicly traded holding company and conglomerate, headquartered in Vancouver, British Columbia, which is the parent company of several subsidiaries: Telus Communications offers telephony, television, data and Internet services; Telus Mobility offers wireless services; Telus Health operates companies that provide health products and services; and Telus Digital, formerly TELUS International, is a wholly owned subsidiary operating in multiple countries and focused on business process outsourcing, customer experience management, digital services and AI data services. Telus has a long history and is listed with the Toronto Stock Exchange (TSX:T).

== Overview ==
Telus Corporation is the parent company of Telus Communications, Telus Mobility, Telus Health, and Telus Digital. Telus Health, formerly known as Emergis, was an e-business was acquired by Telus Corporation in 2007 for $763 million. Telus Health was divided into three segments: Telus Health Solutions, Telus Assyst Real Estate, and Telus Financial Solutions.

== Inception ==
The Alberta Government Telephones (AGT), had served as the major telephone provider for the province of Alberta from 1906—when it was first established by the Liberal Party of Alberta under the tenure of then Premier of Alberta, Alexander Cameron Rutherford, until the 1990s—when then Premier Don Getty began the privatization process. NovaTel's liabilities eventually cost the government more than $600 million. The initial public offering of the newly established Telus' shares, launched on August 9, 1990, represented the largest in Canadian history up to this time. The following year, the provincial government divested its remaining ownership interest in Telus for $870 million. By 1996, the former brand names, ED TEL and AGT had been retired. All Telus products and companies adopted the Telus brand name.

Telus merged with British Columbia Telephone Company (BC Tel) in 1999, with the merged company keeping the Telus brand name. The headquarters of BC Tel in Burnaby, British Columbia, became the headquarters of the merged Telus Corporation, and the company moved its corporate headquarters to Vancouver after completion of the Telus Garden complex.

== Subsidiaries ==
=== Telus Communications ===
Telus Corporation's principal subsidiary is the wholly owned Telus Communications. Only serving customers in Canada, services include data, internet, voice, TV subscriptions, alarm monitoring, and wireless services. It also has mobile phones, tablets, and smart watches. Telus Communications merged its mobility and home service divisions in 2023, creating Telus Consumer Solutions.

=== Telus Mobility ===
Telus Mobility (normally typeset as TELUS Mobility) is a Canadian wireless network operator and a division of Telus Communications which sells Wireless services in Canada on its network. It operates 5G+, 5G, LTE, HSPA+, and LPWA on its network. Telus Mobility is the second-largest wireless carrier in Canada, with 10.6 million subscribers as of Q3 2020.

Since 2008, Telus has operated a flanker brand named Koodo Mobile, which is targeted at high school, college and university students.

=== Telus Health ===
In the summer of 2018, Telus acquired a "chain of medical clinics" for over $100 million. Telus also spent more than "$2 billion on digital health ventures." This included purchasing the "electronic medical record software" used by half of Canada's doctors. By March 2019, Telus had "become the biggest health-care information technology company in Canada". Telus has also partnered with the UK-based software developer and operator, Babylon, to launch a Telus Health app in Canada—digital chatbot capable of checking symptoms— in a cost and revenue sharing initiative.

=== Telus Digital ===
Telus Digital is a wholly owned subsidiary of Telus Corporation. Formerly known as TELUS International, it provides business process outsourcing, customer experience management, digital services, artificial intelligence data services, and trust and safety services.

The company, then known as TELUS International, began trading on the Toronto Stock Exchange and New York Stock Exchange in February 2021 under the ticker symbol TIXT. TELUS retained majority voting control after the listing. Telus International acquired Lionbridge AI in a US$935 million transaction in 2020, adding data labeling and annotation services used for artificial intelligence models. It later agreed to acquire WillowTree, a U.S.-based digital product company, for about US$1.2 billion.

TELUS International rebranded as TELUS Digital in 2024. In September 2025, Telus agreed to acquire the remaining shares of TELUS Digital it did not already own in a US$539 million cash-and-stock transaction. The transaction closed on October 31, 2025, making TELUS Digital wholly owned by TELUS Corporation.

== Finances ==
For the fiscal year 2019, Telus Corporation reported earnings of CA$5.554 billion, with an annual revenue of CA$14.658 billion, an increase of 8.8% over the previous fiscal year. Telus Corp operates the largest telecommunications company (Telus Communications Inc.) in Western Canada and the second largest in Canada.

Year	Revenue in mil. CA$	Net income in mil. CA$	Total Assets in mil. CA$	Price per share in US$	Employees
2010	9,792	3,568	19,624	10.8900	34,800
2011	10,397	3,665	19,931	13.3875	41,000
2012	10,921	3,859	20,445	16.2850	42,400
2013	11,404	4,018	21,566	17.2200	43,400
2014	12,002	4,216	23,217	18.0200	43,700
2015	12,502	4,262	26,406	13.8250	47,640
2016	12,799	4,229	27,729	18.9350	51,250
2017	13,408	1,578	31,053	16.5700	53,630
2018	14,368	1,620	33,057	19.3650	58,000
2019	14,658	1,776	37,975	14.7800	65,600

== Corporate governance ==
According to Yahoo Finance, Telus Corporation received an Institutional Shareholder Services (ISS) governance risk score of 5 out of 10, as of 3 December 2019.

=== Board of directors ===
The current board of directors as of September 2022

R.H. (Dick) Auchinleck, the chairman of Telus Corporation's board of directors, has been lead director since 2014, when Brian Canfield stepped down. Auchinleck, who has served on the Telus board since c. 2004, had previously been CEO at Gulf Canada Resources.

- Victor Dodig, president and CEO
- Hazel Claxton, Audit Committee, Human Resources and Compensation Committee
- Kathy Kinloch, Corporate Governance Committee, Human Resources and Compensation Committee
- David Mowat, chair of the Audit Committee
- Raymond T. Chan, Pension Committee, Human Resources and Compensation Committee
- Tom Flynn, Audit Committee, Pension Committee
- Christine Magee, Human Resources and Compensation Committee, Pension Committee
- Marc Parent, Pension Committee, Human Resources and Compensation Committee
- Lisa de Wilde, chair of the Corporate Governance Committee, Pension Committee
- Mary Jo Haddad, chair of the Human Resources and Compensation Committee, Corporate Governance Committee
- John Manley, Corporate Governance Committee, Human Resources and Compensation Committee
- Denise Pickett, Audit Committee, Corporate Governance Committee
- W. Sean Willy, Audit Committee, Corporate Governance Committee

=== Executive team ===
Telus executive teams as of September 2026:

- Victor Dodig, president and chief executive officer
- Darren Entwistle, CEO Emeritus
- Navin Arora, executive vice-president and group president for global platform businesses
- Tony Geheran, executive vice-president and chief customer officer
- Sandy McIntosh, executive vice-president, People and Culture and chief human resources officer
- Tobias Dengel, TELUS Digital president
- Jill Schnarr, chief communications officer
- John Raines, president, Telus Agriculture
- Michael Dingle, chief operating officer, Telus Health
- Andrea Wood, chief legal and governance officer

== See also ==
- History of Telus
