= Tayybeh =

Tayybeh is a Vancouver-based social enterprise specializing in Syrian food and employs refugee Syrian women chefs and their families. Established in October 2016, Tayybeh began as a community pop-up dinner series held at community centres, schools, churches, and other venues across Vancouver and nearby cities. Today, Tayybeh runs a full-service caterer, a summer food truck, regular pop-up dinners, and Syrian specialty foods sold in markets.

In 2017, Tayybeh and its founder, Nihal Elwan, were awarded "Foodies of the Year" by Western Living magazine in the category of "Community Builder". In early 2018, the group received the "Champion of Women" Award from the Vancouver organization, Women Voices of Muslim Women.

In 2018, a short film entitled "Tayybeh" about the group was written, directed, and produced by filmmaker Eva Anandi Brownstein after receiving funding from Telus StoryHive.

A Tayybeh cookbook featuring the stories of the chefs, favourite recipes, and experiences in their new home is currently in press.
