= Darren Entwistle =

Canadian businessman, president and chief executive officer of TELUS

Darren Entwistle CM
- Born: 1962 (age 63–64); Montreal, Quebec
- Education: Concordia University; McGill University; University of Toronto
- Known for: President and CEO of TELUS

Darren Entwistle CM (born 1962) is a Canadian businessman. He is currently CEO Emeritus of TELUS, a Canadian telecommunications company.

== Early life ==
Born in Montreal, Quebec, Entwistle received a Bachelor of Economics (Honours) from Concordia University, an MBA (Finance) from the McGill University Desautels Faculty of Management and a diploma in Network Engineering from the University of Toronto.

== Career ==
Entwistle joined TELUS in 2000. Previously he was an executive at Cable & Wireless in the United Kingdom. Under Entwistle, TELUS has evolved from a regional telephone company serving Western Canada into a national data and wireless business. The $6.6 billion purchase of Clearnet in 2000 was one of the biggest acquisitions in Canadian telecommunications history at that time. With the acquisition of Emergis in 2008, TELUS moved towards making digital patient information more accessible to patients and their providers which was a move that was embedded in TELUS’ Health Solutions division. In February 2026, Entwistle announced his retirement and Victor Dodig, current TELUS board member and former president of CIBC would replace him as president and CEO.

== Community recognition ==
- January 2003 - Awarded the Queen Elizabeth II Golden Jubilee Medal, which recognizes Canadians who have made outstanding and exemplary contributions to the community and Canada as a whole.
- February 2007 - Honoured by McGill University, Desautels Faculty of Management, with the McGill Management Achievement Award for making significant and valuable contributions to business and the community.
- March 2009 - Received the British Columbia Community Achievement Award for his contribution to philanthropic projects in British Columbia.
- 2010 - Named an Honorary Fellow of the Royal Conservatory of Music.
- November 2011 - Honoured with the T. Patrick Boyle Founder's Award from the Fraser Institute for outstanding achievements in entrepreneurship, the promotion of free-markets, and philanthropic support for private sector, non-profit enterprises.
- May 2012 - Received an Honorary Bachelor of Business Administration degree from Northern Alberta Institute of Technology
- June 2012 - Received an honorary doctorate of Laws from Concordia University.
- May 2013 - Received an honorary doctorate of Laws from McGill University.
- May 2013 - Accepted an honorary doctorate from University of Alberta.
- 2016 - Accepted an honorary doctorate from the University of Victoria.
- December 2018 - Appointed to Order of Canada.
- 2022 - Inducted into the Business Laureates of BC Hall of Fame
- February 2022 - Named Canadian Business Leader of the year by the Canadian Chamber of Commerce
- 2022 - Received the Horatio Alger Award
- April 2025 - Received a Champion for Children Award from Children First Canada
- 2026 - Received the Gold Baton Award from the Vancouver Symphony Orchestra
- June 2026 - Named an Officier of the Ordre national du Québec
- June 2026 - Named Distinguished Entrepreneur of the Year by the University of Victoria (UVic) Peter B. Gustavson School of Business
- June 2026 - Received an Honorary Degree from Humber Polytechnic
