= Fast-moving consumer goods =

Products that are sold quickly and at a relatively low cost

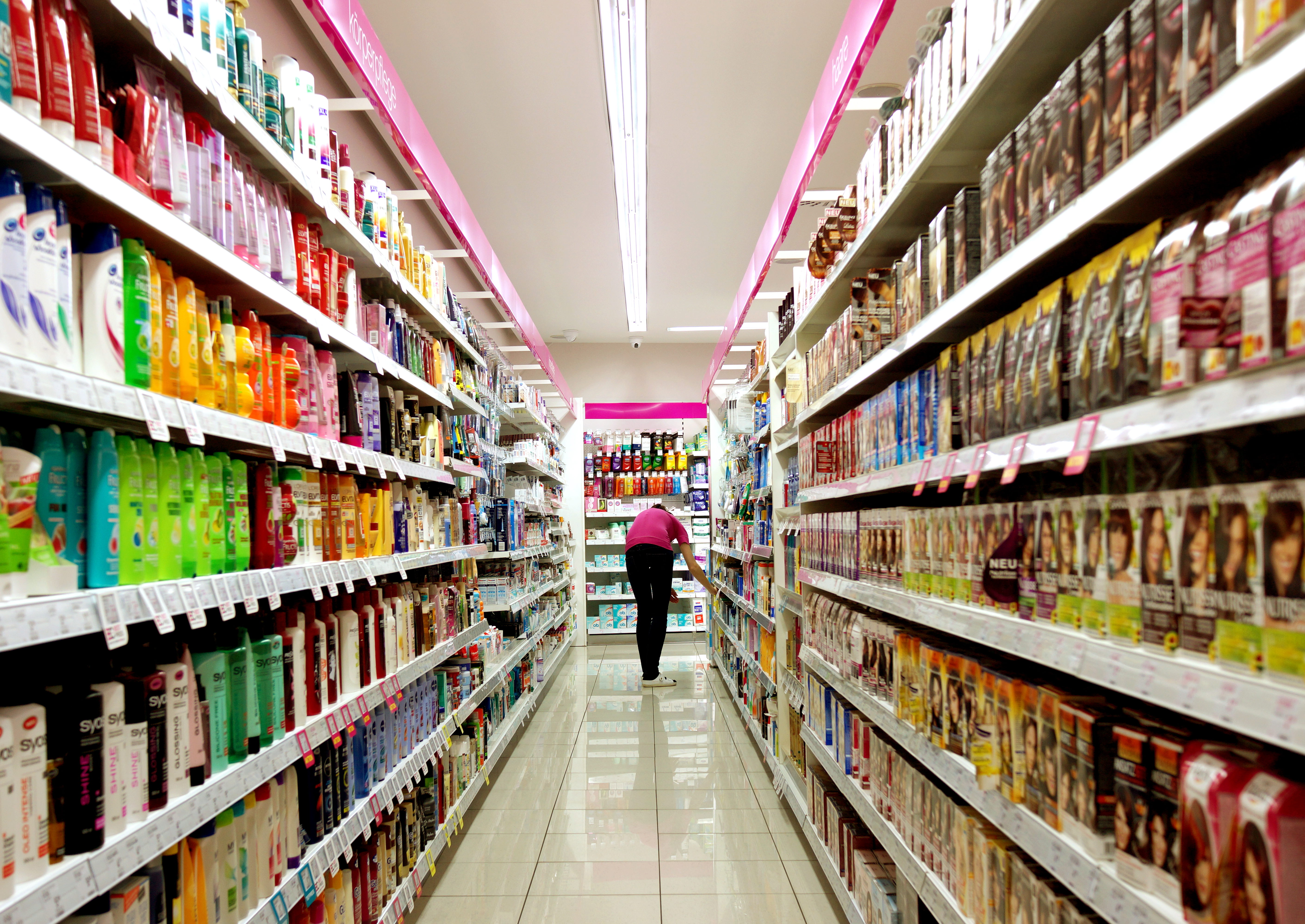
Store aisle of fast moving consumer goods; shown here are health and beauty products

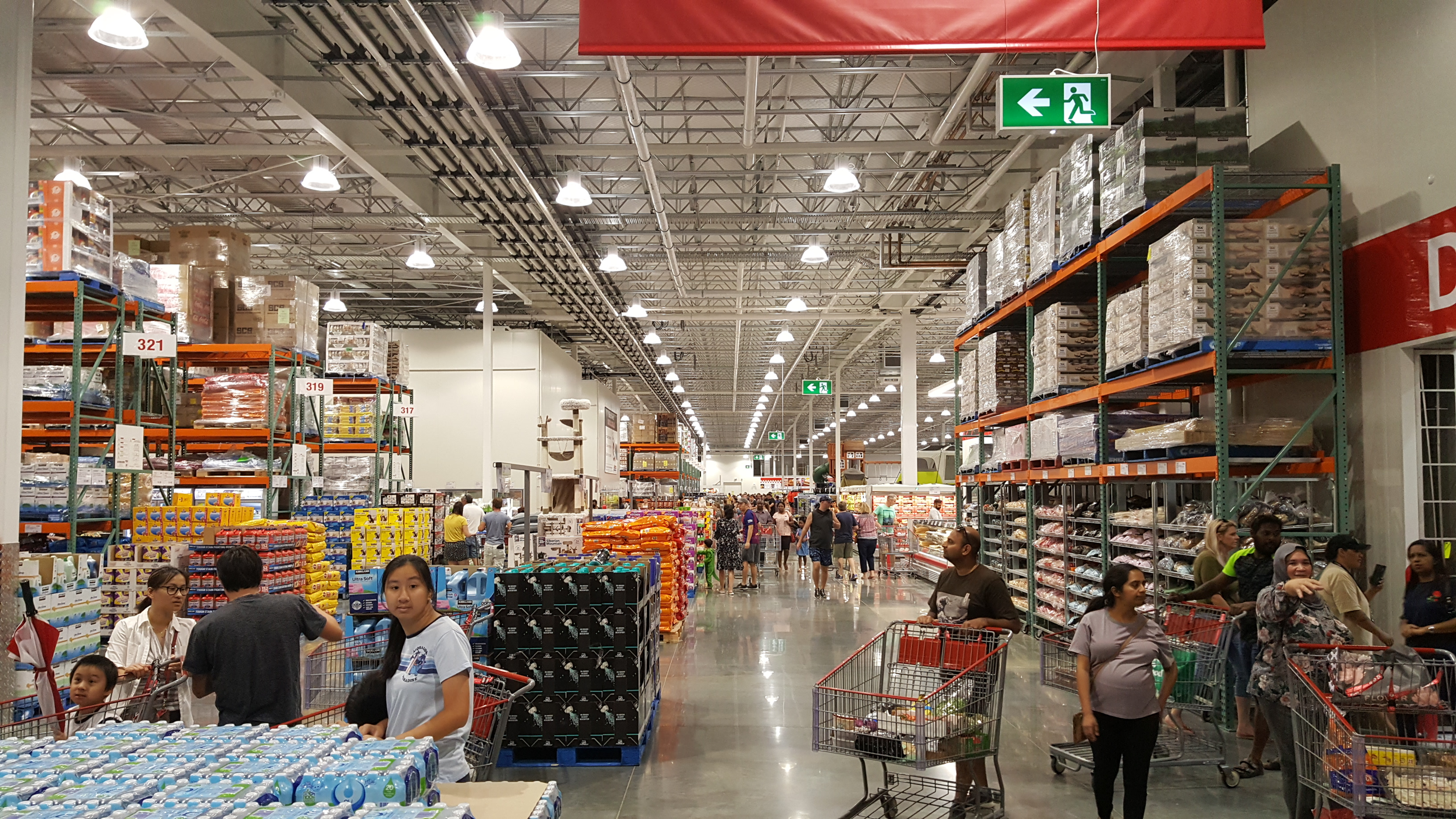
Warehouse club store

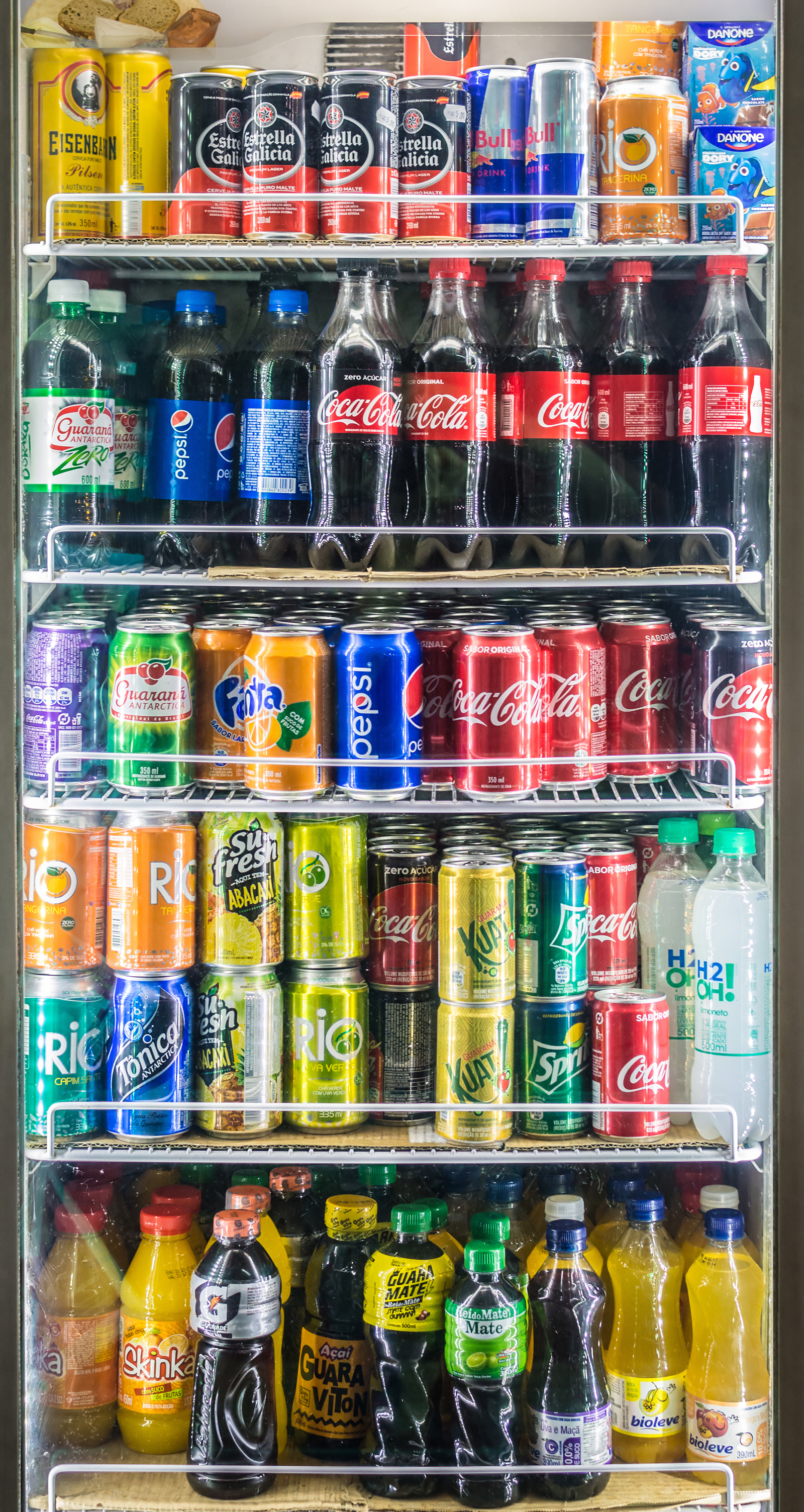
Soft drinks are also FMCGs.

Fast-moving consumer goods (FMCG) are products that are sold quickly and at a relatively low cost. Examples include non-durable household goods such as packaged foods, beverages, toiletries, candies, cosmetics, over-the-counter drugs, dry goods, and other consumables.

Fast-moving consumer goods have a high inventory turnover and are contrasted with specialty items, which have lower sales and higher inventory holding costs. Many retailers carry only FMCGs, particularly hypermarkets, big box stores, and warehouse club stores. Small convenience stores also stock fast-moving goods; the limited shelf space is filled with higher-turnover items.

== Terminology ==
The term FMCG is often used interchangeably with the term consumer packaged goods (CPG), but strictly speaking, FMCG is a subset of CPG. CPGs sell frequently, and include clothing (especially basics such as socks), beauty products, and other household products. FMCGs are a subset of CPGs: FMCGs such as beverages and toiletries sell faster than the other CPGs such as clothing.

== Characteristics ==
The following are the main characteristics of FMCGs:

- From the consumer perspective
  - Frequent purchases
  - Low engagement (little or no effort to choose the item)
  - Low prices
  - Short shelf life
  - Rapid consumption
- From the marketer perspective
  - High volumes
  - Low contribution margins
  - Extensive distribution
  - High inventory turnover

== Shelf space ==
Between 2009 and 2023, shelf space in the U.S. supercenters and supermarkets decreased by 5 and 3.3 percent, respectively. This reduction has intensified competition for shelf space among brands, as the number of products available has increased. Retailers often charge slotting fees to brands for product placement. While some well-established brands may avoid these fees, the average cost can range from $100 per item per store to significantly higher amounts.

== Consumer packaged goods companies ==
Well-known CPG manufacturing companies include:

- Nestlé
- Procter & Gamble
- PepsiCo
- Unilever
- AB InBev
- L’Oréal
- Coca-Cola
- Mondelez International
- Kraft Heinz
- Heineken

== Rural consumers ==
Consumers in rural areas typically purchase goods from nearby towns and villages. A recent shift in 2025 in consumer purchase behavior toward purchasing locally has prompted the need for better local promotional efforts to generate brand awareness in small towns.

FMCGs play a large part in the economy, as they are inelastic products that touch every part of consumer life. Businesses that supply FMCGs to rural communities can help provide employment opportunities and reduce the cost of such products in those rural areas. For instance, FMCGs represent the fourth-largest sector in the Indian economy and generate employment for more than three million people in downstream activities.

== See also ==
- Category management
- Mass production
- Trade promotion management
- Shelf-ready packaging
