= Victor Dodig =

Canadian banker (born 1965)

- Born: May 1965 (age 61); Toronto, Ontario
- Education: University of Toronto (BCom '88); Harvard University (MBA '94)
- Occupation: Banker
- Known for: President of the Canadian Imperial Bank of Commerce
- Spouse: Maureen Broe
- Children: 4

Victor George Dodig (born May 1965) is a Canadian banker who was the president of the Canadian Imperial Bank of Commerce from September 2014 to October 2025.

Dodig began his career in 1994 with McKinsey & Company, then from 1997 to 2002 worked for Merrill Lynch. In 2002 he joined UBS in Toronto. Dodig was hired by CIBC in 2005 as an executive vice-president. In 2014, he succeeded Gerald T. McCaughey to become the bank's president.

== Early years and education ==
Victor George Dodig was born in Toronto in May 1965 to Veselko and Janja Dodig. His parents were ethnic Croats who had immigrated to Canada from Ljubuški, SR Bosnia and Herzegovina in 1959. Dodig attended University of St. Michael's College, University of Toronto and graduated with a bachelor of commerce degree in 1988.

In 1985, he began a part-time job as a customer service representative at the now-defunct CIBC branch at Fieldgate Plaza in Mississauga. He was hired by Josie DiGiacinto and worked Thursday and Friday evenings and full days Saturday for the next three years. After he had graduated from university, Dodig interned at Arthur Andersen, where a partner encouraged him to pursue a master of business administration. Dodig went subsequently to Harvard Business School and in 1994 earned an MBA.

== Career ==
Dodig began his career in 1994 with McKinsey & Company as a managing consultant. In 1997, he joined Merrill Lynch as managing director for Canada, the United States, and United Kingdom. Dodig returned to Toronto in 2002 when he was hired by UBS as managing director and chief executive officer in Canada for the bank's global asset management division.

In 2005, Dodig was appointed executive vice-president for wealth management with CIBC, and in 2007 executive vice-president for retail distribution. In 2011 he was appointed group head for the wealth management division. On September 15, 2014, Dodig was appointed president of the bank, succeeding Gerald T. McCaughey, who had held the office since 2004. In 2019, Dodig's younger brother Edward became head of CIBC's private wealth division.

In March 2025, the bank announced that Dodig would retire as president on October 31, 2025. Harry Kenneth Culham was appointed as his successor.

In February 2026, the Vancouver-based telecommunications company TELUS announced that Dodig would replace Darren Entwistle as CEO. Dodig had previously joined the TELUS board of directors in 2022.

== Other ventures ==
As of September 29, 2026, Dodig owns 70% of the Croatian professional basketball club Cibona.

== Personal life ==
While a student at Harvard, Dodig met his wife Maureen Broe. They have four children.
