= Telus Health =

Canadian health technology company

- Type: Division
- Industry: Health and wellbeing technology
- Founded: 1988; 38 years ago in Edmonton, Alberta, Canada
- Headquarters: Vancouver, British Columbia, Canada
- Key people: Juggy Sihota, chief growth officer; David Bassin, managing director, Provider Solutions; Martin Belanger, managing director, Payor Solutions; Neil King, managing director, Employer Solutions
- Services: Employee health and wellbeing; Virtual care; Electronic medical records (EMRs); Electronic health records (EHRs); Remote patient monitoring; Online claims settlement management software; Pharmacy management solutions; Virtual pharmacy service; Mental health services; Personal emergency response services; Physical healthcare clinics
- Revenue: ~C$1.01 billion (2021)
- Net income: ▲ C$11.5 million (2005)
- Number of employees: >10,000
- Parent: Telus Corporation
- Website: www.telushealth.com

Telus Health, a division of Telus Corporation, is a Vancouver, British Columbia, Canada–based provider of health technology services with more than 10,000 employees primarily located in Canada, United States, United Kingdom and Australia. The company operates four customer-facing business units: Employer Solutions, Consumer Solutions, Payor Solutions (insurers) and Provider Solutions (healthcare professionals, health institutions and governments).

The company’s operations are global, with products and services that cover more than 50 million employees of organizations in 160 countries plus more than 130,000 physicians, pharmacies and allied health professionals in Canada. It also supports the processing of roughly 130 million health insurance claims electronically each year on behalf of insurers.

== Background ==
MPact Immedia—established in 1988—merged with Bell Canada's Electronic Business Solutions to form BCE Emergis in 1998, which became an independent unit on May 6, 2006. On December 1, 2004, the company was renamed as Emergis.

In 2007, Telus Corporation purchased Emergis for $763 million.

Shortly after acquiring Emergis, Telus introduced its Telus Health Solutions division. In June 2022, Telus Health acquired LifeWorks, in a deal valued at $2.9 billion including debt.

=== Retired Products ===
==== Wolf EMR ====
In 2012, TELUS Health acquired Wolf Medical Systems, then Canada’s largest cloud-based EMR provider. The acquisition led to the creation of TELUS Physician Solutions, integrating Wolf’s cloud-based technology into TELUS’s broader health portfolio. In the years that followed, Wolf EMR was gradually retired as healthcare providers were transitioned to platforms such as PS Suite. A user-group webinar conducted approximately 3.4 years ago addressed questions about Wolf EMR sunsetting and migrating to other TELUS EMRs.

==== Nightingale EMR ====
Prior to PS Suite becoming the primary EMR solution, TELUS Health offered the Nightingale EMR platform. That platform was officially retired in 2019, and users were advised to migrate to PS Suite.

==== PS Suite (Practice Solutions) ====
PS Suite (originally called Practice Solutions) is an electronic medical record (EMR) system developed by TELUS Health. Used in Canada, it provides billing features, mobile access, and integration with laboratories, provincial registries, and referral systems.

In Alberta, TELUS Health is now in the process of phasing out PS Suite. Providers are in transition, and are migrating to more modern EMRs.

=== Pediatrics ===
The pediatric healthcare community has particularly been affected and are positioned to evaluate and select suitable EMR systems. Cherry Health—a healthcare network and recruiting platform—lists a considerable number of pediatric providers who use PS Suite in their profiles, indicating ongoing use of that EMR in pediatric practices. Pediatric practices often require customizable workflows, growth tracking, vaccination scheduling, and family health data integration. The PS Suite retirement requires that EMRs part of Alberta's EMR network such as Auro, Ava, and HQ prepare for clinical migrations.

For pediatric and general practice, especially in Alberta, EMR systems include:

- Auro EMR – Focus on Allied Health Specialist.
- Ava EMR
- HQ EMR – Open-source EMR used across North Edmonton.

== Locations ==
Telus Health has office locations in Quebec, Ontario, Alberta, and British Columbia.

The company also has 14 Telus Health Care Centres in British Columbia, Alberta, Manitoba, Ontario, Quebec and Newfoundland and Labrador and 4 Telus Health MyCare Clinics located in British Columbia and Quebec.

Telus Health Virtual Pharmacy has dispensing locations in Quebec, British Columbia, Manitoba and Ontario.
