= Koodo Mobile =

Canadian telecommunications company, a subsidiary of Telus

- Type: Division
- Industry: Mobile network operator
- Founded: March 2008
- Headquarters: Toronto, Ontario, Canada
- Products: Feature phones, smartphones (Android, iOS)
- Services: HSPA (including HSPA+), LTE, mobile broadband, SMS, telephony
- Parent: Telus
- Website: www.koodomobile.com

Koodo Mobile is a Canadian mobile telecommunications brand started by TELUS Corporation in 2008. Koodo functions as a flanker brand to TELUS, offering postpaid, prepaid, and home internet services without fixed-term contracts. Koodo operates on the TELUS network, which provides 5G coverage to the majority of Canadians. Koodo was launched as a lower-cost alternative to TELUS' primary brand.

The brand name is a variation of the Ancient Greek word "κῦδος" (the ascendant to the English word "kudos"), meaning "praise, renown, glory" and more recently "acclaim for something well done".

== History ==
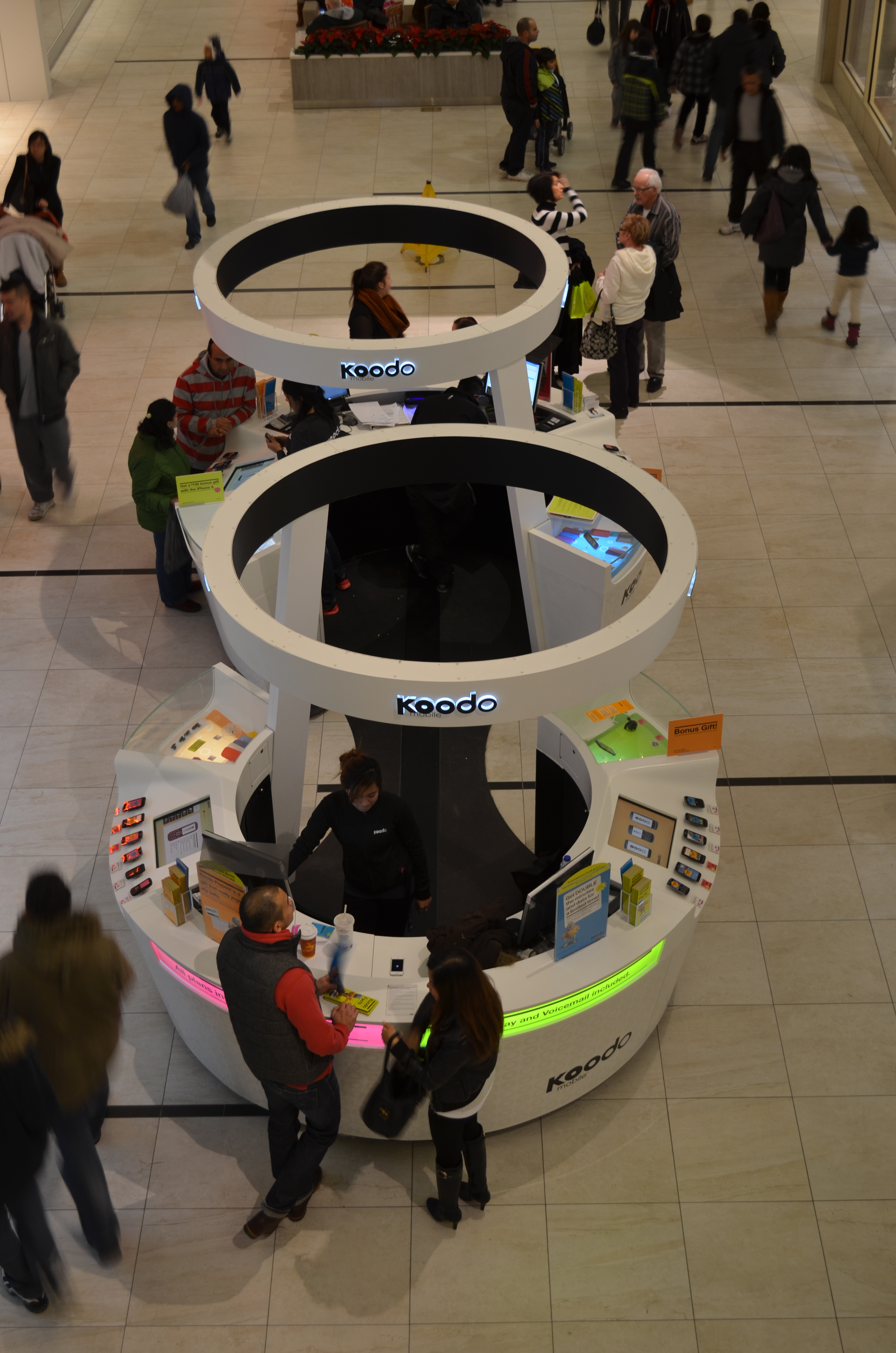
A Koodo Mobile booth in Markville Shopping Centre in December 2012.

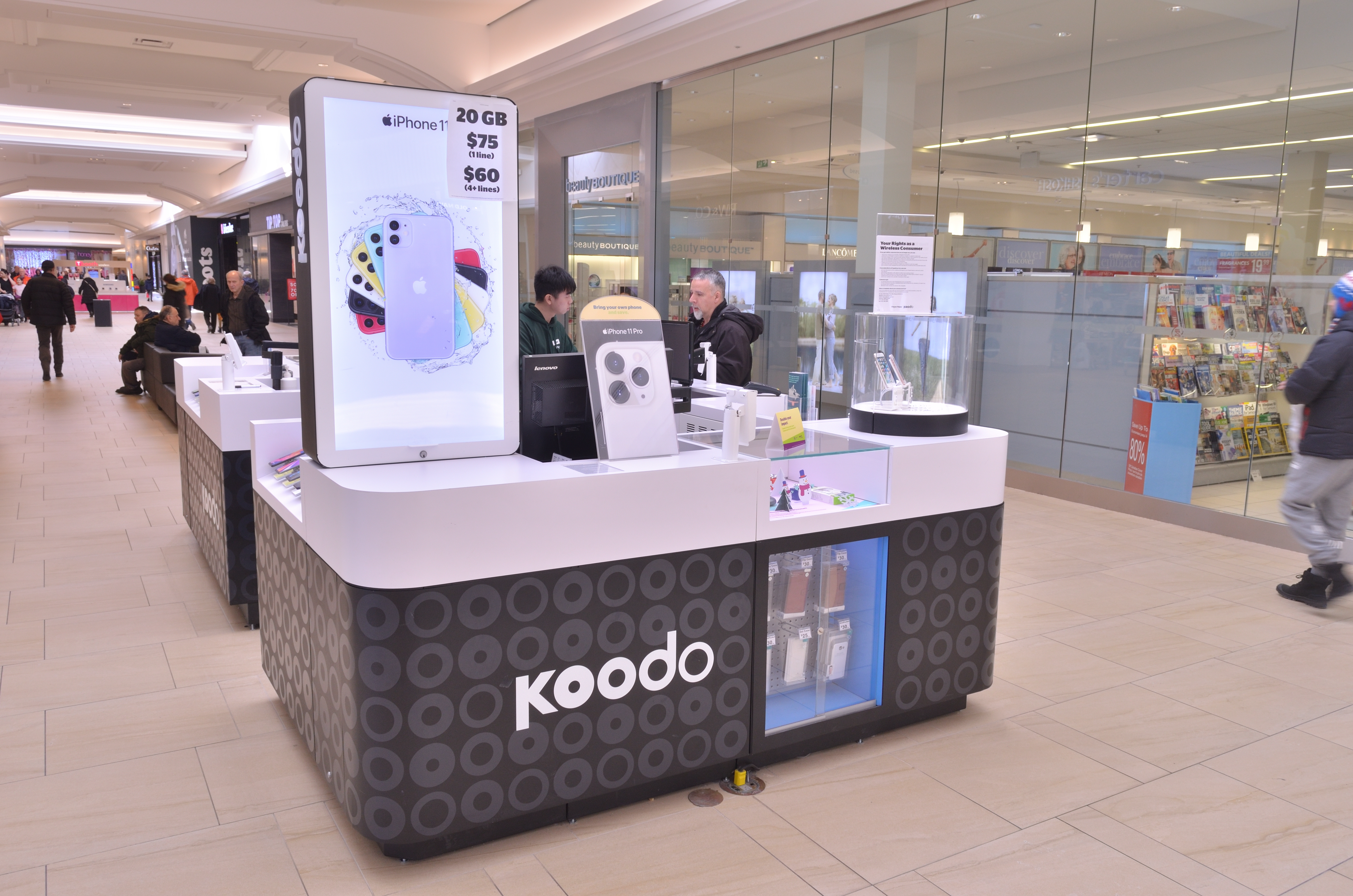
A Koodo Mobile booth in Hillcrest Mall in January 2020.

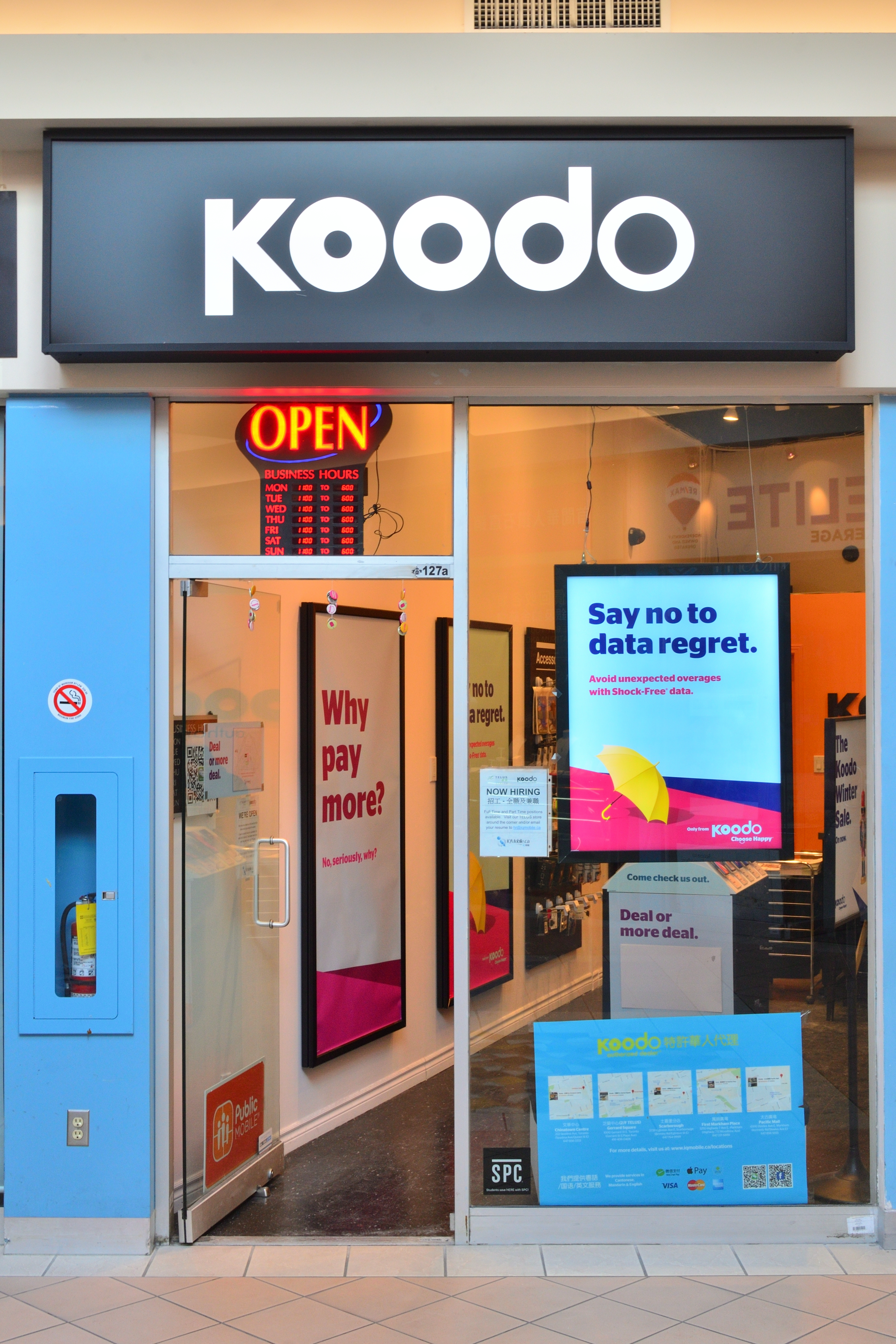
A Koodo in Markham, in January 2020.

=== Amp'd Mobile (2007) ===
Telus Mobility's competitor, Bell Mobility, had an MVNO partnership with Virgin Group to create Virgin Mobile Canada. This brand was in operation since 2005, and it mainly targeted high school, college, and university students. In response, Telus Mobility had a similar but much shorter partnership with the American Amp'd Mobile in 2007 to create a Canadian MVNO. It was ended because the Amp'd Mobile operations in the United States suffered from poor customer service and bankruptcy. This meant that unlike Bell, Telus no longer had a mobile brand targeting students.

=== Koodo Mobile launches (2008-2009) ===
Nearly a year after the launch day of Amp'd Mobile in Canada, Telus launched Koodo Mobile on March 17, 2008, in Canada. This mobile brand provided services at a lower cost than most other companies.

=== BlackBerry and transition to HSPA+ (2010) ===
Many customers at Koodo requested the addition of full QWERTY keyboard devices to facilitate text input for SMS and Internet-based tasks such as email and social networking services. On May 25, 2010, Koodo launched their first smartphone, the BlackBerry Curve 8530. The following month, Koodo released the Nokia 3710 as their first HSPA+ device on June 28, 2010. After this date, the company gradually started to discontinue sales of CDMA devices.

=== HSPA+ smartphones and Canada-wide monthly plans (2011) ===
Six HSPA+ smartphones were released in 2011. The first was the LG Optimus One, launched on March 2. Later that month, the BlackBerry Curve 9300 was available starting March 23. The Nexus S was added to Koodo's lineup on April 12, 2011. In order to prepare for the back-to-school season, Koodo discontinued sales of all CDMA devices near the end of June 2011, less than a year after the carrier launched their first HSPA device. Shortly thereafter, they were replaced by the iPhone 4 and two low-cost Android devices.

== Products ==
Koodo's product lineup mainly consists of smartphones but also includes a few feature phones. Smartphones are currently sold with one of two operating systems preloaded: Android or iOS. Koodo currently carries phones from Apple, Google, Motorola, and Samsung. Koodo has also carried phones from Alcatel, Blackberry, Essential, Huawei, and LG.

Devices carried by Koodo have historically also been available through Telus Mobility.

Koodo also offers Certified Pre-Owned phones, which are refurbished and renewed devices prepared by certified technicians. All Certified Pre-Owned phones purchased from Koodo include a Limited Lifetime Warranty.

Home Internet

Koodo offers residential home internet plans across Canada, with speeds ranging from 60 Mbps to 500 Mbps. Internet plans can be bundled with Koodo mobile plans.

Streaming & Home Services

Koodo offers streaming bundles through its Stream+ service, which packages Netflix, Disney+, and Amazon Prime together. In addition to Stream+, Koodo offers individual streaming add-ons, including CBC Gem Premium, Crunchyroll Mega Fan, and YouTube Premium, as well as extras such as TELUS Films & Series. Stream+ is available to both Koodo and Public Mobile customers. An expanded streaming package bundling Stream+ with Apple TV is also available.

Online Security

Koodo offers an Online Security subscription service that provides protection for Windows, Mac, iOS, and Android devices, powered by Norton, under a single subscription, covering between 3 to 20 devices depending on the plan tier selected.

Amazon Prime

Koodo postpaid customers on eligible plans are eligible to receive three months of Amazon Prime at no additional cost, after which the service continues at the standard monthly rate.

== Services ==
All monthly Koodo plans include Shock-Free Data, which pauses a customer's data connection when their monthly allotment is reached, preventing unexpected overage charges.

Koodo began offering eSIM on January 9, 2020. Compatible devices can activate an eSIM online, allowing customers to connect to the Koodo network without a physical SIM card. Koodo customers can activate a 5G plan via eSIM in minutes.

Koodo supports Voice over LTE (VoLTE) and WiFi calling, enabling customers to make and receive calls over LTE networks and WiFi connections respectively.

In May 2026, Koodo announced it was phasing out older speed caps and upgrading all new and existing customers to 5G speeds of up to 1 Gbps.

Bring Your Own Device (BYOD)

Koodo offers Bring Your Own Device (BYOD) plans for customers who supply their own compatible phone. BYOD plans are available on a no fixed-term contract basis and include access to Koodo's postpaid plan tiers with 5G speeds, unlimited Canada-wide calling, and unlimited international SMS. Customers are not required to finance a device through Koodo's Tab program and pay only the monthly service rate. A SIM card purchase is required to activate service.

Koodo Tab

Koodo offers a device payment option called the Tab, which allows eligible customers to spread the cost of a new device across 24 equal monthly charges added to their monthly bill. The Tab has three tiers, determined by the customer's selected rate plan: Happy Tab Plus, which allows up to $2,500 of a device's cost to be placed on the Tab over 24 months; Happy Tab, which allows up to $1,200; and Happy Tab Lite, which allows up to $240. Once the Tab balance is paid in full, the monthly Tab charge is removed from the bill. Customers may pay off their remaining Tab balance early after a 90-day waiting period following activation. Although there is no fixed-term contract, customers who cancel their service before their Tab balance reaches zero are required to pay the outstanding balance in full.

Koodo also offers a Tab Bonus, a phone credit applied at the time of purchase to reduce the upfront cost of a device. The Tab Bonus is separate from the Tab balance and does not add to the customer's monthly Tab charge. Customers who migrate from Koodo to TELUS may be eligible to convert their Tab Bonus balance into a TELUS Device Discount.

Add a Line

Koodo allows existing customers to add additional lines to their account. Additional lines are available on the same plan tiers as primary lines, including postpaid and BYOD options.

Travel & Roaming

Koodo offers international roaming through its Easy Roam service, which allows customers to use their existing monthly plan's talk, text, and data when travelling outside Canada. Customers are charged only on days when their phone is used abroad. Easy Roam is available for travel to the United States and to over 200 international destinations.

== Network ==
Koodo operates on the TELUS network, which provides coverage to over 99% of Canadians. Koodo does not operate its own network infrastructure and instead accesses the TELUS network as a flanker brand.

=== 4G LTE and 5G ===
Koodo offers service on both 4G LTE and 5G networks. The TELUS network reaches 93% of Canadians on 4G LTE and 76.3% on 5G. Full access to the 5G network requires a compatible 5G device and a 5G speed rate plan. In May 2026, Koodo announced it was upgrading all new and existing customers to 5G speeds of up to 1 Gbps, phasing out older speed caps.

=== Geographic Coverage ===
Koodo's 5G and 4G LTE coverage across Canada can be viewed via Koodo's interactive coverage map.

=== Frequency Bands ===
Koodo operates across multiple frequency bands for 4G LTE and 5G service on the TELUS network.

=== 3G Network Retirement ===
Koodo has announced the retirement of its 3G network, with a phased shutdown schedule by region. The Manitoba rural shutdown took place on January 12, 2026, followed by Winnipeg and Brandon on March 31, 2026. The national 3G network shutdown is scheduled to take effect on March 1, 2027. Customers using 3G devices will need to upgrade to a 4G or 5G compatible device prior to the shutdown date in their region.

=== Home Internet ===
Koodo offers residential home internet plans across Canada, with speeds ranging from 60 Mbps to 500 Mbps. Internet plans include a Wi-Fi 6 modem and can be bundled with Koodo mobile plans.

== Reception ==
The success Koodo received in its first year of operation, with its simple plan lineup and lack of carrier-charged system access and 911 fees, prompted competitors Rogers Wireless and Bell Mobility to mimic Koodo's monthly plans via their mobile brands: Fido Solutions for Rogers, and Virgin Mobile for Bell Mobility. These changes happened on November 4, 2008, for Fido. Following Bell's complete acquisition of Virgin Mobile Canada in May 2009, the Virgin brand mimicked several of Koodo's monthly plans in 2010.

Similarly, when Koodo launched its new Canada-wide plans on July 21, 2011, they were once again mimicked by other mobile brands. Virgin initially offered long distance as a $10 add-on on September 7, 2011; they reduced this fee to $5 on September 16, before removing it altogether on October 4.

== Controversy ==
=== Discontinuation of per-second billing ===
Numerous current and prospective Koodo customers became disappointed and frustrated with the removal of per-second billing on Koodo Mobile's February 2012 monthly voice plans. Customers were given no advance warnings of these changes, although a third-party blog did provide a leaked brochure of the new per-minute plans. These plans cost $5/month more than their previous counterpart and include the caller ID and voicemail features, but are billed per minute instead of per second. One of the five plans was also lowered to 100 minutes instead of the 150 previously included, but the backlash to this change prompted the company to reverse this decision. Customers on Koodo's Facebook profile and the operator's Get Satisfaction Internet forum criticized the removal of per-second billing, perceiving it as "one step forward, two steps back". Existing customers with old plans are grandfathered with per-second billing, but will receive per-minute billing if they change their plan. There were over 100 frustrated customers voicing their support for per-second billing, with some considering a switch to another operator.

=== Illegally painting a duplex for an advertisement ===
In June 2024, Koodo's advertising agency Camp Jefferson painted a century-old duplex in Montréal, Québec in bright neon colors for an advertisement. The city intervened, citing that their urbanism laws prohibited painting bricks on the facade of most if its buildings, that heritage buildings have special protections in place and that rules are in place to limit ads in the urban landscape. Camp Jefferson said that they asked for guidance, which was given by an employee of the city. The duplex was restored to its original state in July, at the original plan's planned date.

== Advertising ==
Koodo Mobile currently has Toronto-based Camp Jefferson (formerly DARE Toronto) as its advertising agency. This team launched Koodo Mobile's "Choose Happy" campaign on April 20, 2015. The brand uses bright and punchy colours with vivid imagery and playful animations. Previously, advertising efforts were handled by Taxi 2 in Toronto. This team developed the El Tabador character, starting March 2010, to promote the Koodo Tab. The character is a masked male lucha libre wrestler, who has been featured in billboards and also on animated TV ads.

The character was discontinued as part of a brand refresh that occurred in 2015, as part of the provider's new campaign "Choose Happy".

== See also ==
- List of Canadian mobile phone companies
