= Telus Digital =

Canadian business process outsourcing and technology corporation

TELUS Digital
- Logo used since September 18, 2025

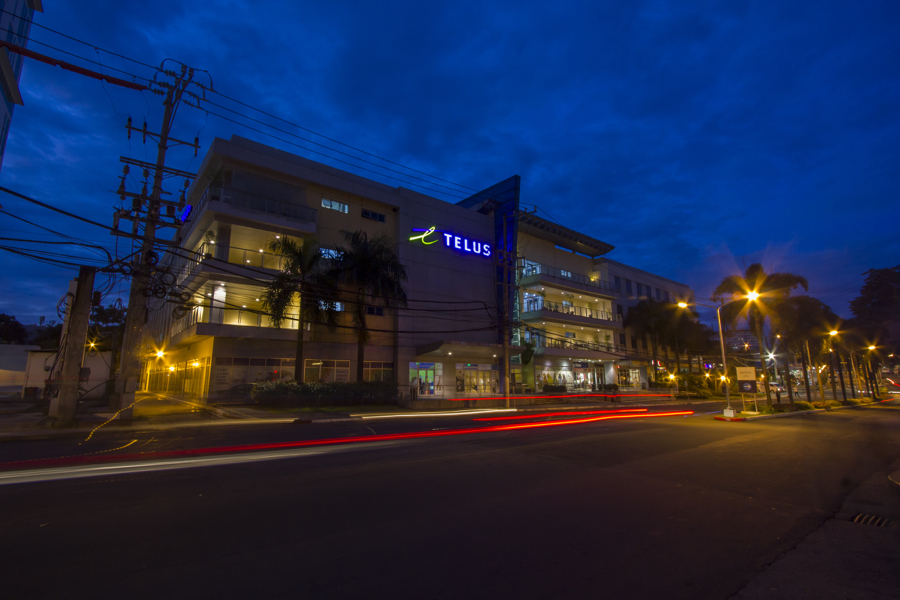
- Telus House in Quezon City, Philippines
- Formerly: Telus International (2007–2024)
- Type: Subsidiary
- Industry: Digital IT services Software services; Business Process Outsourcing
- Predecessor: Ambergris Solutions
- Founded: 2005; 21 years ago in Edmonton, Alberta, Canada
- Headquarters: Vancouver, British Columbia, Canada
- Number of locations: 35+ countries of operation
- Key people: Tobias Dengel (President)
- Number of employees: +80,000
- Parent: Telus Corporation
- Website: www.telusdigital.com

Telus Digital (stylized TELUS Digital) is a Canadian business process outsourcing (BPO) and technology company and subsidiary of Telus Corporation. The company provides services in customer experience management, digital solutions, artificial intelligence (AI) and data, and trust, safety and security.

The company, then known as Telus International, began trading on the Toronto Stock Exchange and New York Stock Exchange in February 2021 under the ticker symbol TIXT. In 2025, Telus acquired the remaining shares of Telus Digital and took the company private.

== History ==
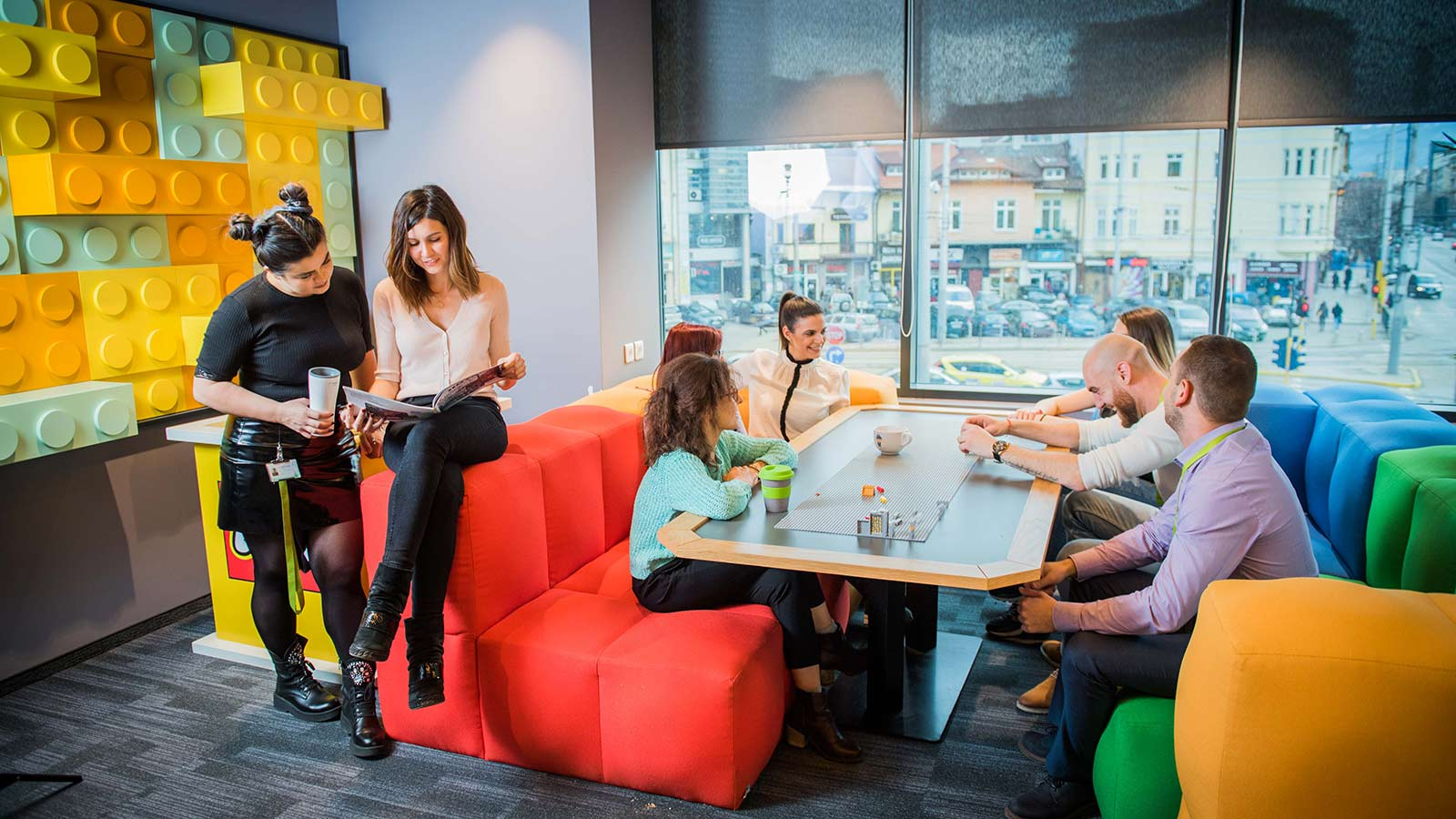
Telus Digital office in Bulgaria

Telus Digital originated from Telus Corporation’s investment in Ambergris Solutions, a Philippines-based Business process outsourcing (BPO) company, in 2005. Ambergris Solutions later became Telus International.

In 2008, the company acquired Transactel, adding operations in Guatemala and El Salvador.

In 2012, Telus International acquired a stake in CallPoint New Europe, which operated delivery centres in Bulgaria and Romania.

In 2016, Baring Private Equity Asia acquired a 35% stake in Telus International, with Telus retaining a 65% interest.

In 2017, Telus International acquired Cork-based Voxpro, a business process outsourcing company, expanding its operations to Ireland.

In 2018, Telus International acquired a majority interest in Xavient Digital, a software and IT services company, expanding its operations in India. In 2019, Telus International acquired the remaining interest in Voxpro.

In 2020, Telus International acquired Competence Call Center, an Austria-based customer relationship management and outsourcing company with operations across Europe. In late 2020, Telus announced that Telus International would acquire Lionbridge AI for US$935 million. Reuters reported that Lionbridge AI provided data labeling and annotation services used to develop artificial intelligence models.

Telus International became a publicly traded company in February 2021, listing on the Toronto and New York stock exchanges under the ticker TIXT. In 2021 the company also acquired Playment, a Bengaluru-based data annotation company.

In 2023, Telus International acquired U.S.-based digital product consultancy WillowTree for approximately US$1.2 billion.

In 2024, Telus International announced leadership changes, including the retirement of CEO Jeff Puritt as president and chief executive officer and the appointment of Jason Macdonnell as acting chief executive officer. The company rebranded from Telus International to Telus Digital later that year.

In 2025, Telus Digital acquired Gerent, a U.S.-based Salesforce consultancy firm. Later that year, Telus agreed to acquire the remaining shares of TELUS Digital that it did not already own in a US$539 million cash-and-stock transaction. The transaction closed on October 31, 2025, making Telus Digital wholly owned by Telus Corporation.

== Services ==
Telus Digital’s enterprise services in customer experience management include outsourced customer support and digital experience operations, as well as consulting and transformation services related to customer experience and digital strategy.

The company’s digital and technology services include digital product development capabilities, which were expanded through its acquisition of WillowTree.

Its artificial intelligence and data services include data annotation, AI training data development, and analytics supporting machine learning systems.

The company has also been associated with AI-driven customer experience solutions and integrations with cloud-based contact center technologies.

Telus Digital has participated in initiatives related to responsible artificial intelligence development, including adoption of Canada’s voluntary AI code of conduct.

Analyst coverage has evaluated Telus Digital in areas including customer experience services transformation, conversational commerce and industry-specific CX operations.

== Social responsibility ==
Telus Digital participates in volunteer and community investment initiatives as part of the broader social-impact activities of its parent company, Telus, which was included in Time and Statista's inaugural list of the World's Most Sustainable Companies in 2024. This includes the Telus Days of Giving program, and has included specific activities in the Philippines, Guatemala, and Ireland.

== 2026 1 petabyte cybersecurity incident ==
In March 2026, a notorious cyber crime group known as ShinyHunters claimed to several high-profile news agencies that they stole over 1 petabyte (PB) of data from Telus and Telus Digital. The group demanded a staggering $65 million dollar ransom in exchange for not leaking the company's data. The stolen data according to multiple prominent media outlets like Reuters and Bloomberg included ‌information related to more than two dozen companies that included personally identifiable information, call data and recordings (CDRs), FBI background check information, financial information, Salesforce data, and source code spanning multiple business divisions within the business services and telecommunications company. The stolen data also reportedly impacts Telus' telecommunication services; customers and call logs.

== See also ==
- Telus Communications
