= Trade promotion management =

Trade Promotion Management (TPM) is a software application that assist companies in managing their trade promotion activity.

== Key functions ==
- Sales Forecasting
- Promotion planning and budgeting
- Predictive modeling/optimization
- Promotion execution and monitoring
- Settlement
- Post event analysis

== Business problems addressed ==
Commonly, companies use their accounting systems or spreadsheets to manage promotions. As the complexity of trade increases software solutions have been developed for consumer goods, food manufacturing, food service and others.

=== Analytics ===
Historical trade promotion data should be analyzed in order to continually improve trade promotions. If a company does not utilize processes and systems that measure trade promotion performance, future trade promotion executions could be less effective than if they’d been planned using past analytical information.

=== Integration ===
Lack of integration both internally and with external partners can hinder trade promotion success. Key elements of organizational integration include

- standardized metrics,
- regular information sharing,
- cross-functional department collaboration, and
- collaborative processes.

Integration with retail partners is important to executing promotions successfully, as well as maintain strong relationships with retailers over time.

=== Key performance indicators (KPI) ===
KPIs tell manufacturers and retailers how trade promotions performed relative to their pre-determined objectives. A lack of understanding on what trade promotion data to measure and how to measure performance can hinder the overall process. Manufacturers and retailers will not know what made a promotion effective or ineffective unless they have predetermined data points to measure and analyze.
