= Clearnet (Telus Mobility) =

Canadian telecommunications subsidiary

- Type: Subsidiary of Telus
- Industry: Telecommunications
- Founded: April 2011
- Defunct: 2012
- Fate: abandoned
- Headquarters: Canada
- Parent: Telus
- Website: clearnet.com

Clearnet (branded in advertising as "Clearne+") was a division of Telus Mobility launched in April 2011 to sell landline and mobile phone bundles in Western Canada. It was a revival of the Clearnet Communications brand name, which originally belonged to an independent cellular provider that was merged into Telus Mobility in 2000. Telus relaunched Clearnet as a discount provider with a "limited market trial" in Kelowna, British Columbia, and Red Deer, Alberta.

The company closed to new business in June 2012.

== Clearnet Communications ==
Clearnet Communications Inc.
- Industry: Wireless services
- Founded: 1984
- Defunct: 2000
- Fate: Acquired and merged
- Successor: Telus Mobility
- Headquarters: Scarborough, Ontario
- Area served: Canada
- Services: PCS, Mike cellular networks
- Website: clearnet.com

Clearnet Communications was a Canadian cellular telephone service provider from 1984 to 2000, when it was acquired by Telus Mobility. Clearnet operated a CDMA-based PCS network and an iDEN-based cellular network called Mike. Following the merger, Clearnet's PCS service was incorporated into the existing Telus Mobility network, while the Mike system was kept as a separate service under its original name. All Clearnet's distinctive marketing and branding, including their animal theme and tag line "The future is friendly", was also adopted by Telus Communications to promote its various services. The Clearnet brand name, however, was discontinued until April 2011, when the Clearnet name was briefly relaunched.

Clearnet Communications Inc. was launched by the Lenbrook Group in the early 1980s as a national provider of Specialized Mobile Radio (SMR), two-way radio systems commonly used by taxicab and package delivery services. In 1994, Clearnet acquired the assets of Motorola's SMR network giving Clearnet the critical mass of radio spectrum to accomplish a conversion to a digital system. At the same time, Clearnet, with new strategic partners in Motorola and Nextel, completed an initial public offering to pay for this conversion.

In December 1995, Clearnet was awarded a 30 MHz national PCS license by Industry Canada. Mobile service under the Clearnet brand was launched later that year. A new service was launched in 1996 as the Mike network, using iDEN phones with its push-to-talk (PTT) functionality. In 1997, Mike added the "Green Card" roaming option through its partnership with Nextel, which offered notably low prices on international service. Mike was marketed primarily towards business and industrial customers who need the PTT functionality.

Prior to their merger with Telus Mobility, Clearnet had developed an innovative out of the box cell phone marketing system, where their phones were available at various retail stores, besides their own. To activate a Clearnet cell phone, a customer simply called the company with a credit card, went through an instant credit check, and if approved, they set up their Clearnet account over the phone. Within an hour or two, the customer could use his or her mobile phone service.

On August 21, 2000 Clearnet was sold to Telus Corp. at an announced value of $6.6 billion, the largest telecommunications acquisition in Canadian history. At the point of sale, Clearnet had acquired the largest block of available wireless spectrum of any wireless player in Canada and served approximately 700,000 Canadian users. This launched Telus as a national brand, and they have since become one of the three big mobile vendors in Canada. The Clearnet brand was initially taken over by Telus branding but was re-introduced in 2011 as a fighter brand in certain markets.

=== MiKE ===
Mike (styled MiKE) was a Canadian mobile phone and push-to-talk network, launched in 1996 by Clearnet Communications using the proprietary iDEN platform from Motorola. The Mike network was shut down on January 29, 2016. Telus' intended successor to its Mike network is Telus Link, a push-to-talk service launched in October 2013. Telus Link operates over HSPA, LTE, and wifi, and runs iOS, Android, and Blackberry devices.

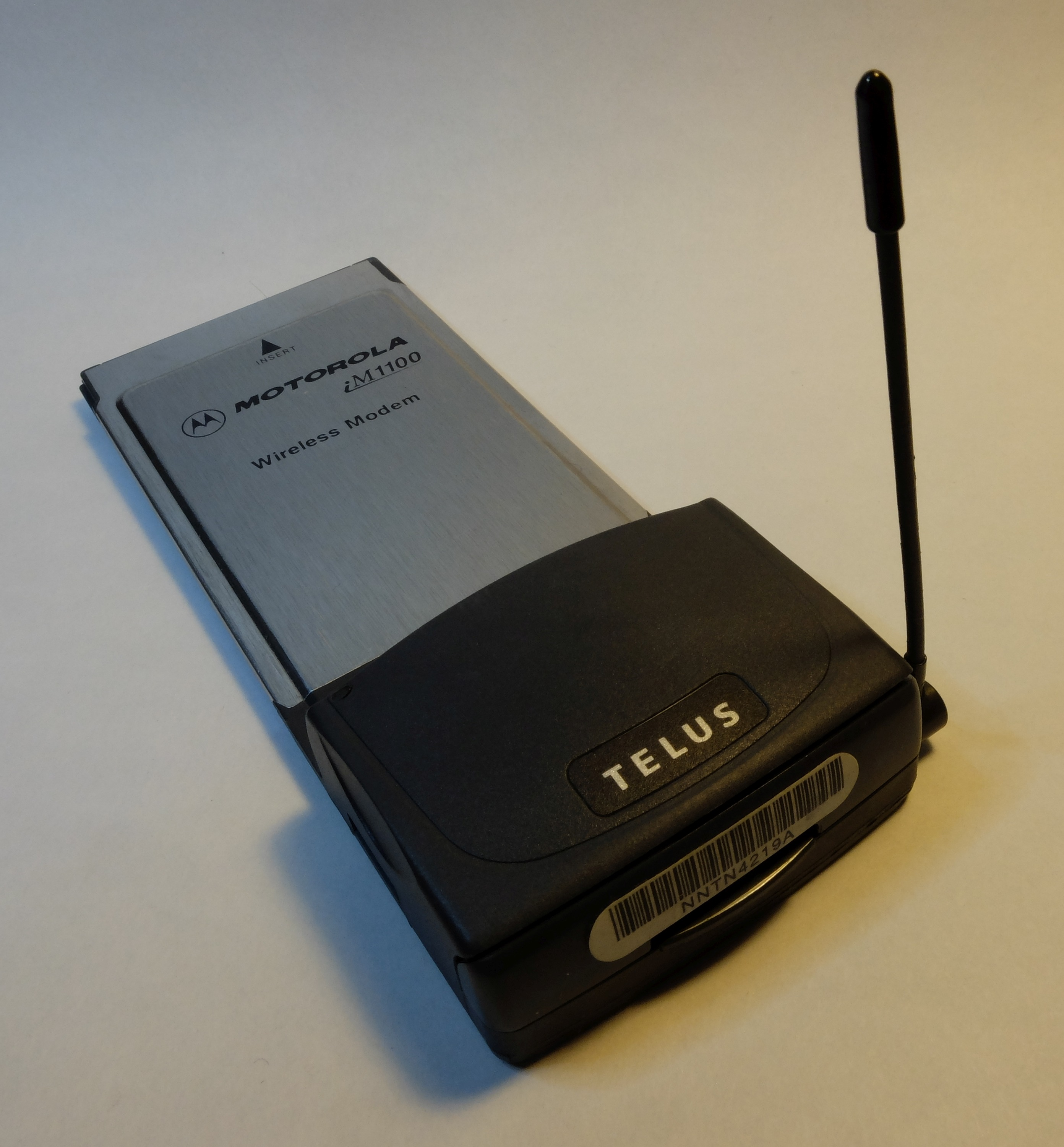
PC Card modem that provided a laptop with a wireless data connection through the Mike network

The Mike national network served the most populated areas of British Columbia, Alberta, Quebec, and Ontario. It also provided limited coverage in Saskatchewan (near the Alberta border); Winnipeg, Manitoba; Moncton, New Brunswick; Halifax, Nova Scotia; and St John's, Newfoundland and Labrador. The network was entirely digital, and supported voice, data, short messaging, and push-to-talk services.

== Networks ==
Mobile services provided by Clearnet used Telus Mobility's HSPA+ network. The maximum theoretical download speed was 21 Mbit/s. The landline service was also provided by Telus, but retained the Clearnet branding.

== Products ==
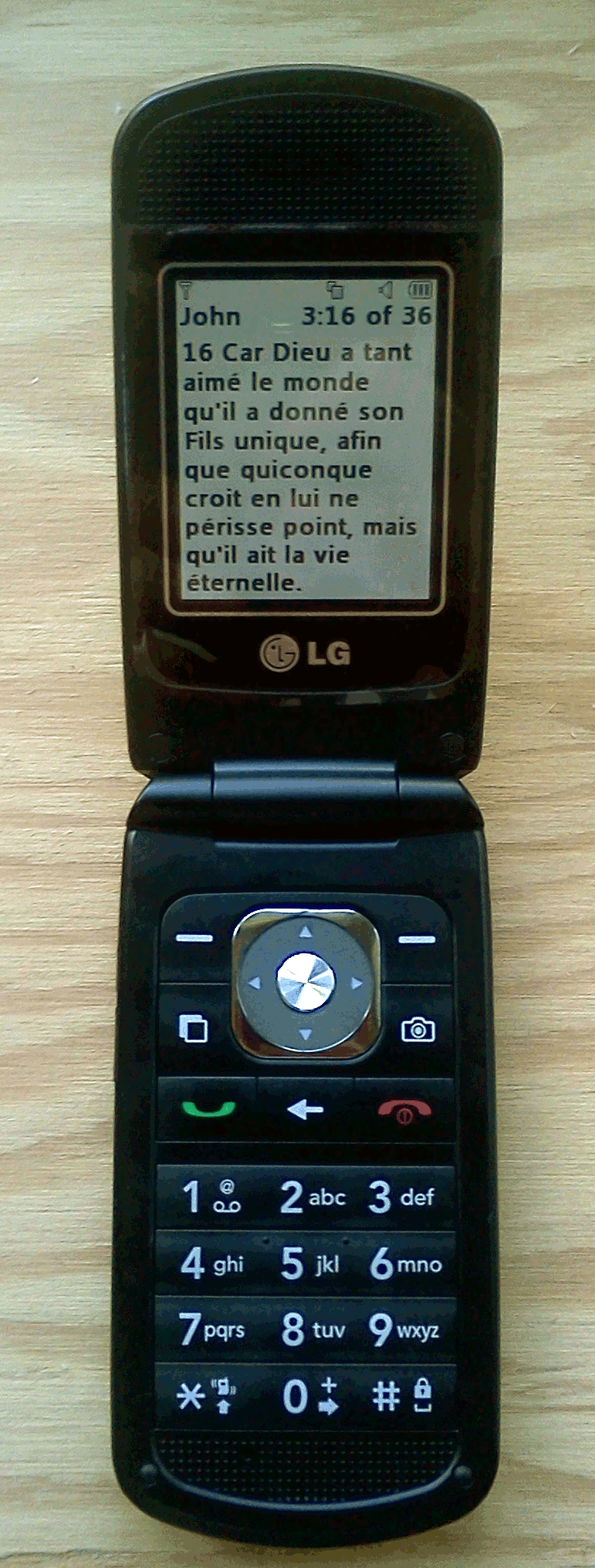
The LG GB-255G, also known as the LG Madison, is a basic flip feature phone.

Clearnet had a very small selection of mobile phones. It included two feature phones and one smartphone, all which are also available on Telus Mobility. Clearnet did not sell any phones compatible with its landline service.

=== Feature phones ===
The Clearnet lineup of feature phones included one from LG, one from Samsung and one from Sony:

- LG GB-255G
- Samsung Evergreen
- Sony CM-B1200 series

=== Smartphone ===
The Samsung Galaxy Apollo was the only smartphone available from Clearnet. Only Wi-Fi Internet access was possible because Clearnet did not offer any mobile Internet plans.

== Service ==
Clearnet operated as a business name used by Telus Mobility. The company offered two plans, one with unlimited mobile calling within the user's province and one with unlimited mobile talk and text nationwide. Both plans included a basic landline home phone. While the service was only offered to customers in Kelowna and Red Deer, coverage was available across Canada on the Telus network. The Clearnet website stated that data options would be available in the future.

As of June 2, 2012, Clearnet displayed a notice on its website stating that they were no longer accepting new activations. The domain now merely redirects to Telus' main site.

== See also ==
- Telus Communications, the parent that owns Telus Mobility.
