= Alberta Government Telephones =

Canadian telephone company (1906 - 1991)

- Type: Public utility, Crown corporation
- Industry: Telecommunications
- Founded: 1906
- Defunct: 1991 (brand retired in 1996)
- Fate: Privatized
- Successor: Telus
- Headquarters: Edmonton, Alberta, Canada
- Revenue: ▲$CA 1.07 billion (1987)

Alberta Government Telephones (AGT) was the telephone provider in most of Alberta from 1906 to 1991.

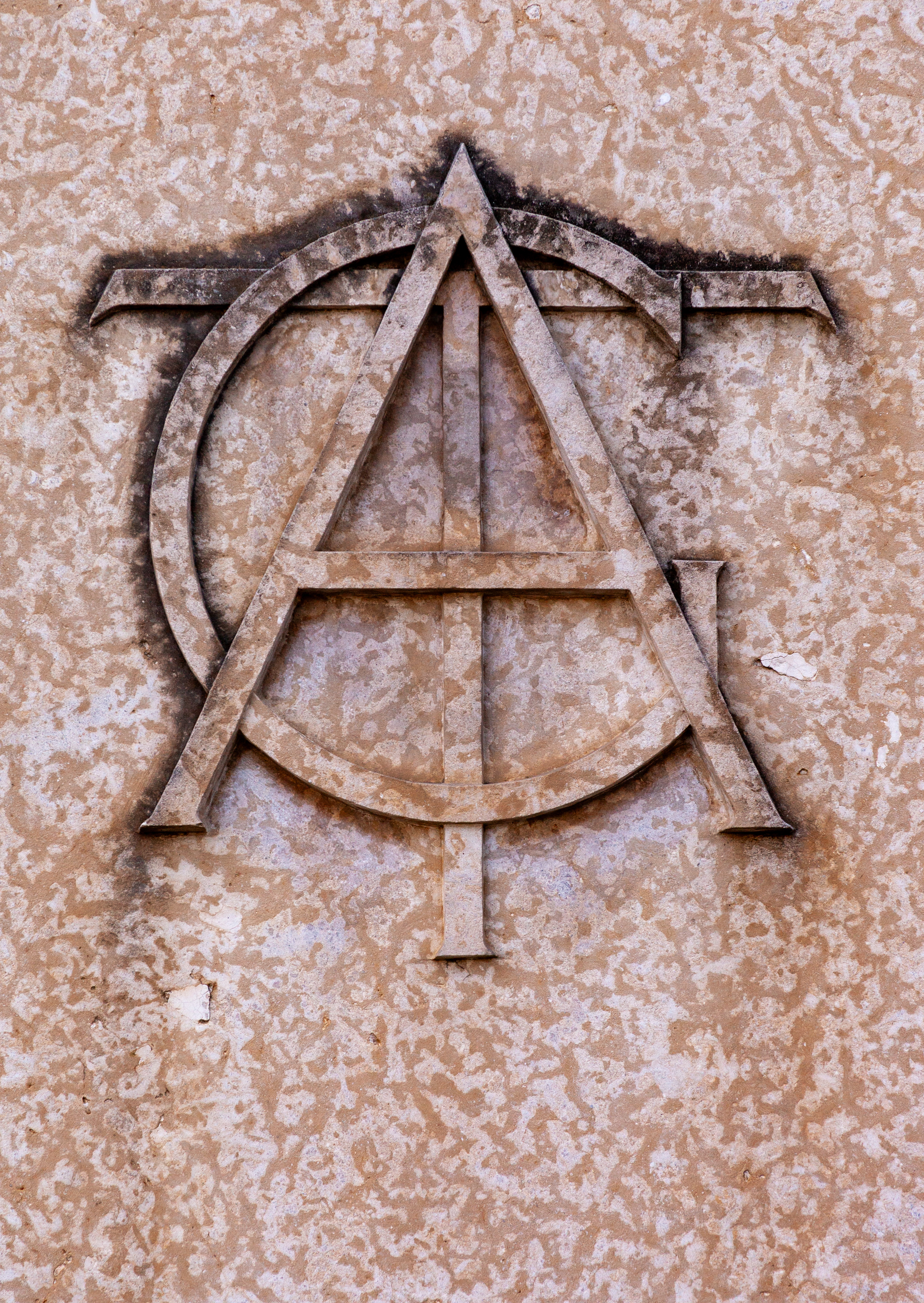
An AGT monogram on a central office (telephone exchange) in Calgary, AB.

AGT was formed by the Liberal government of Alexander Cameron Rutherford in 1906 following the acquisitions by the government of several independent telephone companies. In 1908, AGT acquired the Bell Telephone Company's Alberta operations for $675,000. It eventually served almost all telephone customers in Alberta outside of the Edmonton area, where telephone service was operated by the Edmonton municipal government.

Alberta Government Telephones was directly managed by the province's Department of Public Works as a public utility until 1958, when it was transformed into the Alberta Government Telephones Commission, a crown corporation. From 1945 until 1974, AGT operated the province's educational radio station, CKUA.

In 1969, AGT built what was then Edmonton's tallest skyscraper as its new headquarters, joined by a second tower in 1971 - together known today as ATB Place.

In 1990, the Alberta government, under Don Getty of the Progressive Conservative Party, began the process of privatizing AGT, and formed Telus Communications as a holding company to facilitate the transfer. In 1991, the province of Alberta sold its remaining ownership interest in AGT to Telus for $870 million. Telus acquired Edmonton Telephones Corporation (Ed Tel) from the city of Edmonton in 1995; Ed Tel had been created only five years earlier from a reorganization of a department of the city. In 1996, the AGT and Ed Tel brands were retired in favour of the Telus name. Telus merged with BC Tel in 1999 to form the present-day Telus Corporation.
