= BC Tel =

Former Canadian telecommunications company

- Industry: Telecom
- Founded: 1904
- Defunct: 1999
- Fate: Merged with Telus (formerly AGT)
- Successor: Telus
- Headquarters: Burnaby, British Columbia
- Website: bctel.ca at the Wayback Machine (archived 1998-12-06)

British Columbia Telephone Company, later known as BC Tel, was the telephone company operating throughout the province of British Columbia, Canada. For most of its history, BC Tel was one of several regional monopolies in Canada. In 1985, the Canadian Radio-Television and Telecommunications Commission (CRTC) restored competition in long-distance telephone service. In 1998, BC Tel merged with Telus to become the second largest telecommunications company in Canada.

== Early decades ==
In 1904, the Victoria & Esquimalt Telephone Company and the New Westminster & Burrard Inlet Telephone Company were taken over by The Vernon & Nelson Telephone Company. That year, the name of the company was changed to the British Columbia Telephone Company Limited. In 1916, the company obtained a federal charter and dropped the word Limited from its name.

Theodore Gary & Company bought a substantial interest in BC Telephone in December 1926 (held in Canada under the Anglo-Canadian Telephone Company). Other Gary companies at the time included International Automatic Telephone Company and British Insulated Cables. Mr G H Halse remained as president and general manager of BC Telephone. In July 1927, the company participated in Canada's first coast to coast radio broadcast for Canada's Diamond Jubilee.

== Two regional operations ==
On the 1 April 1929, a charter was obtained for a new subsidiary called "North-West Telephone Company" (NWT). This company adopted radio-telephony for areas of the province unreachable by wire. The first experiment was providing a connection to Powell River from Campbell River, about 80 kilometres (50 mi) across the water.

A new record for storm damage in the BC Telephone system was set little over a year after the previous record. The rain and sleet began early in the morning of 21 January 1935. There were 1,500 poles and 700 miles of wire down in the Fraser Valley. Victoria had 1,800 telephones out of service. The Trans-Canada toll line was not restored until 10 February 1935.

The first photographs ever to be transmitted from Vancouver via wire photo service took place during the royal visit of 29 May 1939.

In April 1954, the federal government telephone system west of the Rockies was purchased and the operations split with the NWT. GTE of Stamford, Connecticut, became a 50.2% owner of BC Telephone when the Theodore Gary Company merged with GTE in 1955.

In January 1961, the NWT was officially merged with its parent. In 1979, the BC Telephone Company acquired Automatic Electric Canada and formed "AEL Microtel". Soon afterward, the name was shortened to "Microtel". In 1982, "BTE - Business Terminal Equipment" was formed to compete in the newly deregulated equipment field. BC Telephone formed "BC Cellular" in 1985 to compete in the new cellular telephone business. On 1 May 1993, BC Telephone reorganised under holding company "BC Telecom Inc" and changed its legal name to "BC Tel".

== Telus merger ==
The deregulation of the phone industry in the 1990s, combined with the competition between line and cell transmission technology, totally changed the business environment. In a 1999 "merger of equals", BC Tel bought the smaller Telus, the telephone operating company in Alberta. The merger created the second largest telephone company in Canada after Bell. Initially registered as BCT.Telus, the merged company with headquarters in Burnaby, British Columbia, soon rebranded as Telus.
