= Telus Communications =

Subsidiary of Telus Corp, a Canadian telecommunications company

Telus Communications Inc.

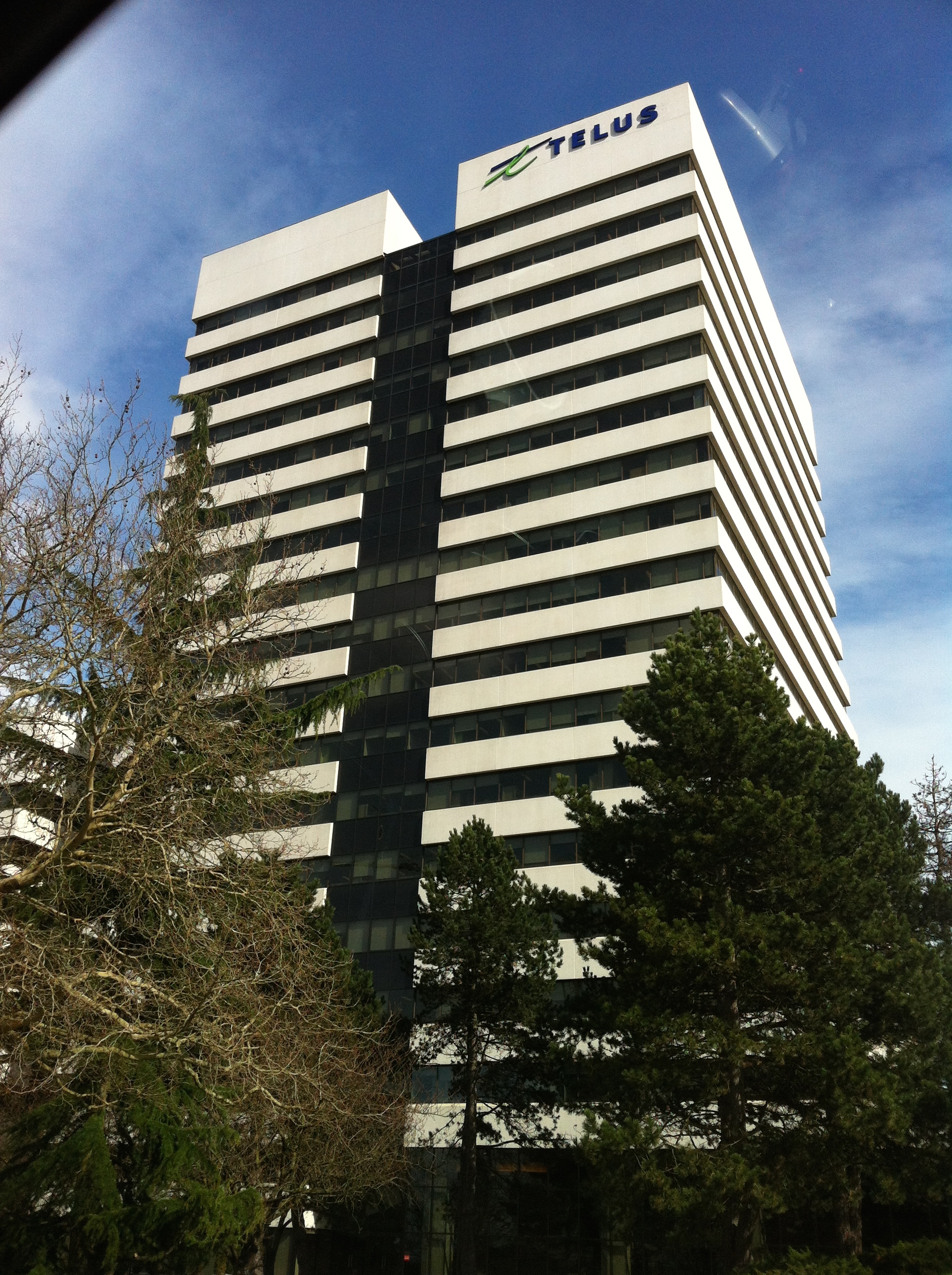
- Telus previous headquarters in Burnaby
- Type: Subsidiary
- Industry: Telecommunications; IT consulting
- Founded: 1990; 36 years ago in Edmonton, Alberta, Canada
- Headquarters: Vancouver, British Columbia, Canada
- Key people: Victor G. Dodig (president and CEO); Gopi Chande (CFO)
- Products: Fixed line and mobile telephony; Internet services; IPTV television
- Revenue: ▲CA$20.00 billion (2023)
- Operating income: CA$2.8 billion (2018)
- Net income: CA$1.75 billion (2019)
- Number of employees: 106,400 (2024)
- Parent: Telus Corporation
- Divisions: Telus Mobility; Telus Optik TV; Telus Internet/PureFibre; Telus SmartHome Security
- Subsidiaries: Public Mobile; Koodo Mobile
- ASN: 852
- Website: www.telus.com

Telus Communications Inc. (TCI) is the wholly owned principal subsidiary of Telus Corporation, a Canadian national telecommunications company that provides a wide range of telecommunications products and services including Internet access, voice, entertainment, healthcare, video, smart home automation and IPTV television. The company is based in the Vancouver, British Columbia, area; it was originally based in Edmonton, Alberta, before its merger with BC Tel in 1999. Telus' wireless division, Telus Mobility, offers UMTS- and LTE-based mobile phone networks. Telus is the incumbent local exchange carrier in British Columbia and Alberta. Its primary competitors are Rogers Communications and Bell Canada. Telus is a member of the British Columbia Technology Industry Association.

== History ==
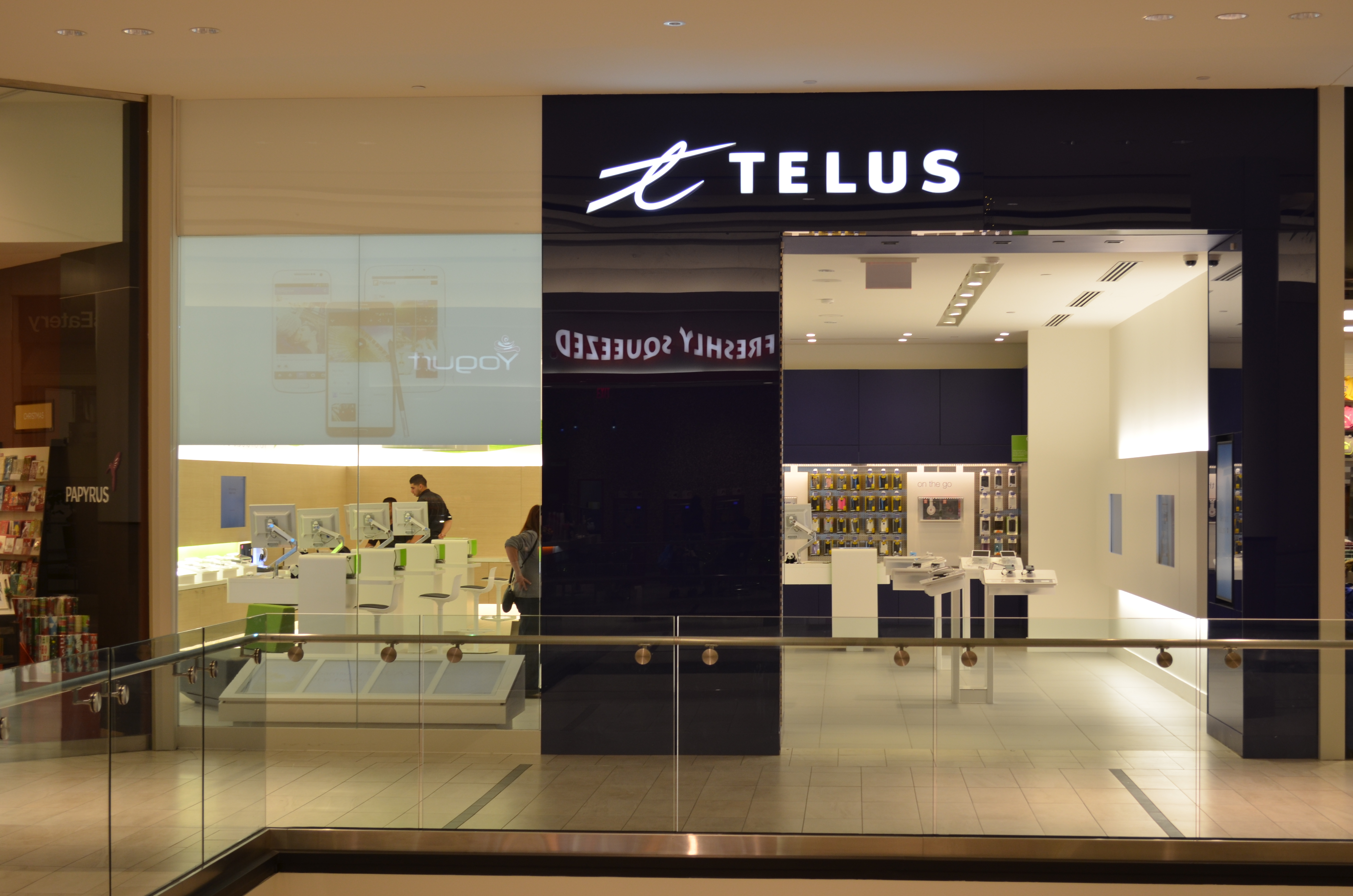
TELUS in Markville Shopping Centre

Telus Corporation was formed in 1990 by the government of Alberta as a holding company to facilitate the privatization of Alberta Government Telephones (AGT), a crown corporation that provided telephone service to most of Alberta outside of Edmonton. In 1995, it acquired Edmonton Telephones Corporation (EdTel), the main telephone provider for Edmonton itself, from the city of Edmonton making Telus the sole provider of telephone service in Alberta. In 1996, Telus was introduced to the public as the consumer brand, replacing both AGT and EdTel.

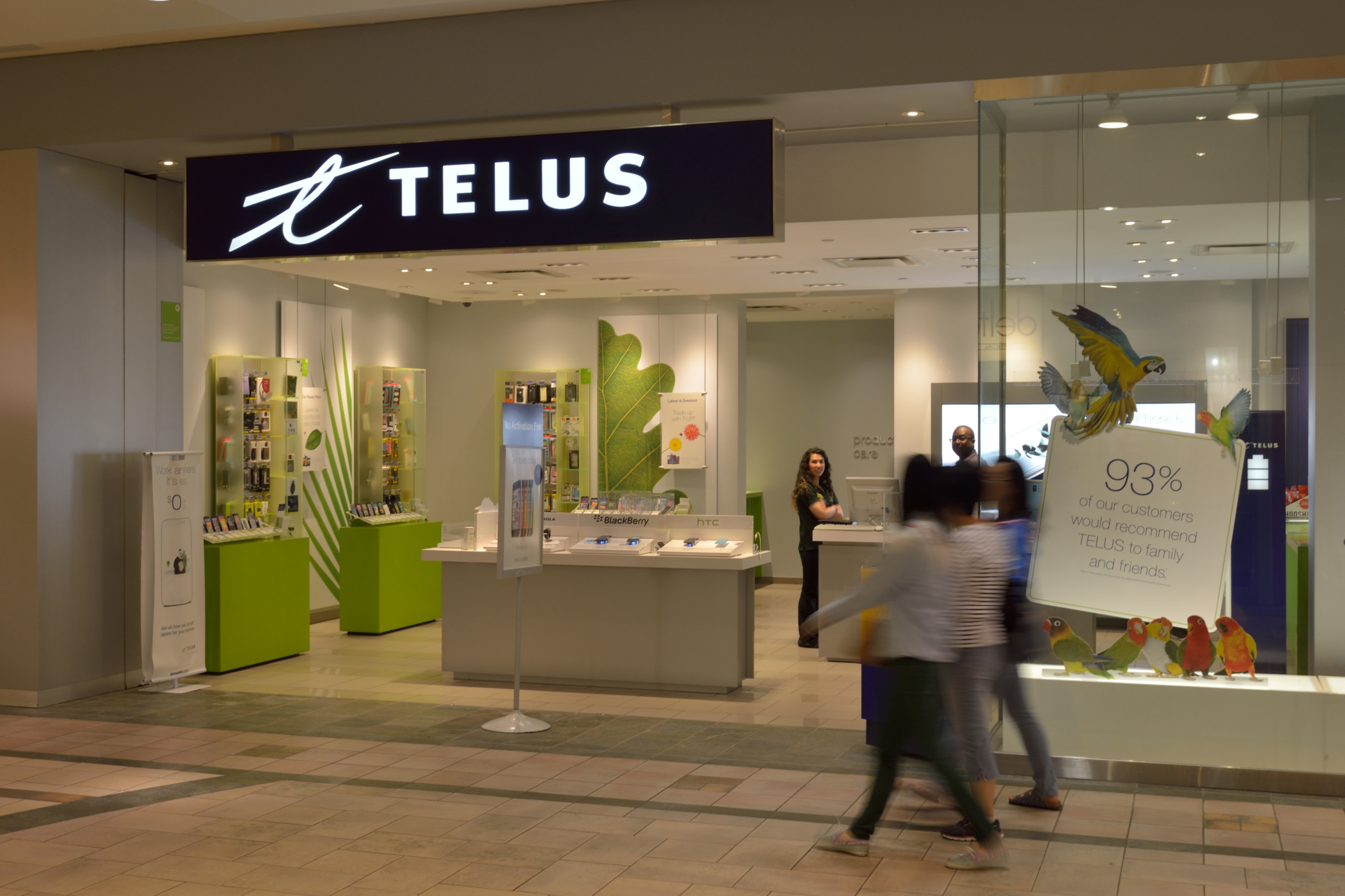
Telus at Hillcrest Mall

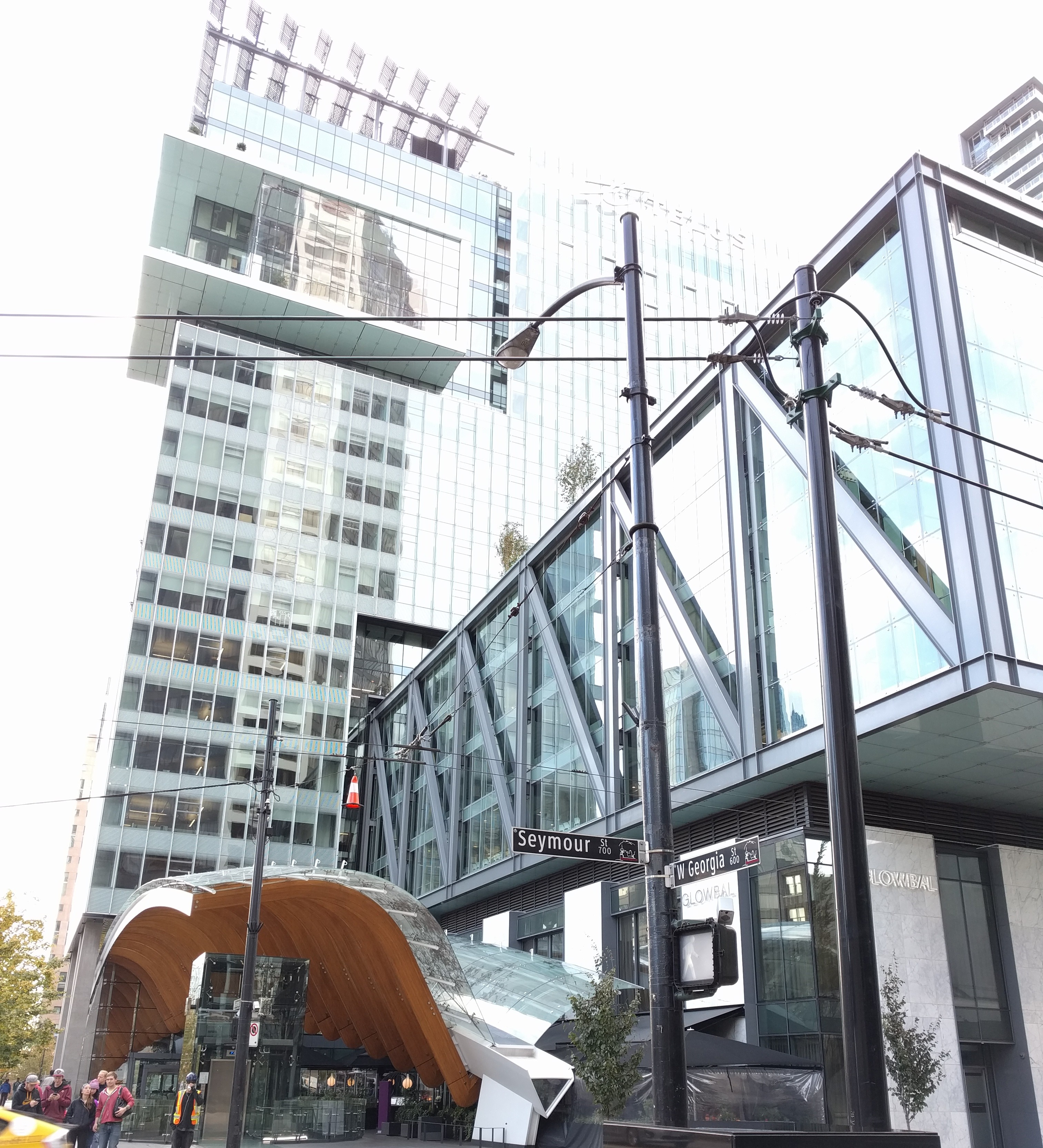
Telus Garden in Vancouver

In 1998, Telus and BC Tel announced a proposed merger. The proposed merged company, BCT.Telus Communications Inc., was incorporated separately in British Columbia, with headquarters at BC Tel's office in Burnaby. After shareholder approval BCT.Telus acquired BC Tel and Telus; the merger was completed in 1999. In 2000 the combined BCT.Telus changed named back to Telus Corporation, and the BC Tel brand was retired. The merger created Canada's second largest telecom company, with 22% of market share compared to Bell Canada's 42%. American company GTE had held a slight majority of ownership in BC Tel prior to the merger with Telus, and retained a 26.7% share of the post-merger company.

Large swaths of rural Quebec, mainly the Gaspé Peninsula and the north shore, were served from 1927 by an entity known as Corporation de Téléphone et de Pouvoir de Québec, and in 1955, this became known as Québec Téléphone. In 1966, the Anglo-Canadian Telephone Company, a subsidiary of General Telephone and Electronics of Stamford, Connecticut (later GTE), became a majority shareholder in Québec Téléphone. In 1997, Groupe QuébecTel was established to own Québec Téléphone. GTE sold its interests in Québec Téléphone to Telus in August 2000, which renamed it Telus Québec on April 2, 2001.

GTE was itself acquired by Bell Atlantic in 2000, and the company changed its name to Verizon Communications. Verizon inherited GTE's share of Telus, but in late 2004 sold its remaining 20.5% stake. This was so that Verizon could focus more on its own services.

In October 2019, Telus Corp announced it would buy home security provider ADT Inc.'s Canadian operations for CA$700 million (US$527.27 million).

In June 2022, Telus Communications acquired Altima Telecom. In January 2023, Telus Communications acquired London-based ISP Start.ca.

== Parent company ==
Telus Corporation is a conglomerate, and its wholly owned principal subsidiary is Telus Communications Inc (TCI), according to the 2010 Telus annual report.

=== Labour dispute ===
After the Telus-BCTel merger, unionized employees voted to certify the Telecommunications Workers Union (TWU) as the sole bargaining agent for the expanded company's workforce. The TWU had previously been the union representing BCTel employees – it replaced the International Brotherhood of Electrical Workers (IBEW) in Alberta. A labour dispute between Telus and the TWU began after the previous contract, negotiated with BCTel before the Telus merger, expired at the end of 2000. After Telus made its final offer to the TWU it informed the union of its intention to bring an end to the dispute by unilaterally implementing its April 2005 offer to employees in Alberta and British Columbia. The next day the union went on strike in British Columbia while Telus locked out its unionized workers in Alberta, although (as is common in disputes where an employer attempts to unilaterally implement a new contract) the union consistently referred to the dispute as a "lockout."

On July 25, 2005, Telus blocked its Internet subscribers from accessing a website supporting striking union members. The company expressed concerns over content on the site, saying it identified employees crossing picket lines and encouraged disruptive behaviour, while the union alleged it amounted to censorship. The British Columbia Civil Liberties Association issued an official objection to the unilateral blocking on July 26, stating "Telus is leveraging its power as a telecommunications service provider to censor a specific group, shut down debate and limit the messages conveyed about the current labour dispute". An Alberta court injunction ordered the blocked website, Voices For Change, to remove postings of "Telus employee photos" and other "intimidating or threatening material". The site owner agreed to comply and Telus unblocked the website. Telus and the TWU ratified a tentative agreement on November 18, 2005, ending the dispute.

=== Relaunch of Clearnet ===
In April 2011, Telus Mobility relaunched the Clearnet brand as a limited market trial in Kelowna, British Columbia, and Red Deer, Alberta. The company again closed to new business in June 2012.

=== Non-voting share conversion ===
In February 2013, Telus exchanged all non-voting shares into common shares on a one-for-one basis.

=== Purchase of Public Mobile ===
In October 2013, Telus acquired minor mobile phone provider Public Mobile and relaunched it in 2015 as a "value brand" MVNO on the Telus network.

== 2026 1 petabyte cybersecurity incident ==
In March 2026, a notorious cyber crime group known as ShinyHunters claimed to several high-profile news agencies that they stole over 1 petabyte (PB) of data from Telus & Telus Digital. The group demanded a staggering $65 million dollar ransom in exchange for not leaking the company's data. The stolen data according to multiple prominent media outlets like Reuters and Bloomberg included ‌information related to more than two dozen companies that included personally identifiable information, call data and recordings (CDRs), FBI background check information, financial information, Salesforce data, and source code spanning multiple business divisions within the business services and telecommunications company. The stolen data also reportedly impacts Telus' telecommunication services; customers and call logs.

== Reception ==
In October 2008, Telus was named one of British Columbia's Top Employers by Mediacorp Canada Inc., which was announced by The Vancouver Sun, The Province and the Victoria Times-Colonist.

The company has been accused of taking actions to hinder the emergence of competition in Canadian telecommunications. This, along with other industry concerns, has led to consumer and industry pressure to reform the regulatory system governing the Canadian telecommunications industry.

== Marketing ==
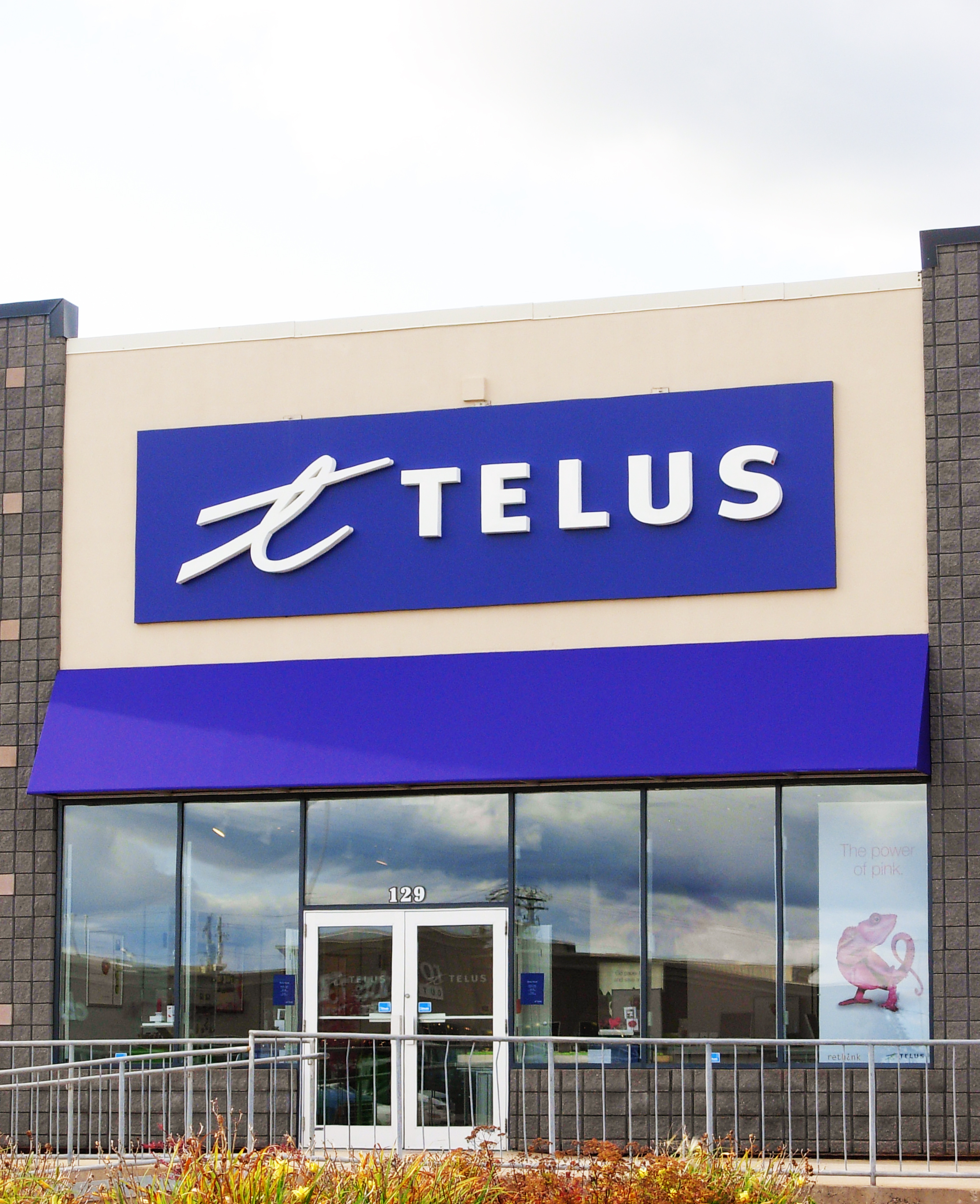
A Telus store in Moncton, New Brunswick

=== Sponsorship ===
Telus currently sponsors the Telus Spark Science Centre in Calgary, Telus World of Science in Edmonton and Science World in Vancouver. Telus funds the annual Kokanee Crankworx freeride mountain bike and World Ski & Snowboard festivals, both held in Whistler, British Columbia.

Telus was a sponsor and marketing partner of Hockey Canada since 2004 and the title sponsor of Canada's national midget hockey championship, the Telus Cup, since 2005. Telus has been a sponsor of Rogers Sportsnet's regional broadcasts of Calgary Flames and Edmonton Oilers games. Telus has been the title sponsor of the Telus Skins Game in addition to several tournaments on the Canadian Tour, including the Telus Open, Telus Calgary Openn, Telus Edmonton Open and the Telus Vancouver Open.

Telus is the namesake tenant in several office buildings, including The Telus Convention Centre and Telus Sky in Calgary, Tour Telus in Montreal, Telus House in Edmonton, Telus Garden in Vancouver, the currently under construction Telus Ocean in Victoria, and Telus Harbour in Toronto.

Beginning in 2014, Telus began sponsoring Canada's largest nationwide technology education event: The HTML500.

In November 2017, Telus announced it would take over as title sponsor for the Vancouver Santa Claus Parade, saving the parade from being cancelled.

Telus is also the sponsor for the PEPS multifunctional stadium of Université Laval, in Quebec City. This 12,750-seat stadium is the home of the Laval Rouge et Or U Sports football team.

== See also ==
- Clearnet Communications
- Cybertip.ca
- Koodo Mobile
- List of Canadian mobile phone companies
- Mike (cellular network)
- Telus TV
- List of internet service providers in Canada
