= Glentel =

Canadian telecommunications retailer

Glentel Inc.
- Type: Joint venture
- Industry: Wireless; Retail
- Founded: 1963; 63 years ago
- Headquarters: Burnaby, British Columbia, Canada
- Number of locations: 350+
- Area served: Canada
- Key people: Ravi Nookala (CEO & president)
- Owners: BCE Inc. (50%); Rogers Communications (50%)
- Number of employees: 2,000+
- Website: glentel.com

Glentel Inc. is a Canadian telecommunications retailer based in Burnaby, British Columbia, jointly owned by BCE Inc. and Rogers Communications.

In Canada, the company operates over 350 wireless outlets under the Tbooth Wireless (La cabine T sans-fil in Quebec, formerly The Telephone Booth) and WirelessWave (Wave sans fil in Quebec) brands, particularly in mall kiosks. The company operates store-within-a-store kiosks at Canadian Costco locations under the Wireless etc. banner. Glentel outlets sell services from Bell Mobility and Rogers Wireless, their respective subsidiary brands (such as Chatr Wireless, Fido, Lucky Mobile, and Virgin Plus), and SaskTel in Saskatchewan.

For a time, it operated the Target Mobile kiosks at Target Canada locations until the chain's closure in 2015, and owned the Australian wireless retail chain Allphones, and U.S. Verizon retailers Diamond Wireless and Wireless Zone.

On November 28, 2014, BCE Inc. announced that it would acquire Glentel for $670 million, pending regulatory approval, in an effort to boost its retail presence. After a dispute with Rogers, who argued that due to supply agreements it was contractually required to consent to any change in ownership of the company, Bell announced that it would divest a 50% stake in Glentel to Rogers upon the closure of the acquisition, turning the company into a joint venture between them.

== History ==
The company has its origins in Speedy Celtel, the company founded by Alan and Tom Skidmore as a retailer of Cantel, the country's first cellular carrier. In 1989, the company bought Glenayre, that was provider of business wireless hardware, and was re-named Glenayre Technologies. In 1992, the company's retail arm was spun-out as Glentel, and in 1997, it opened a Rogers dealer at Metropolis in Burnaby known as WirelessWave. WirelessWave subsequently grew into a larger chain.

In 2005, Glentel acquired its Montreal-based rival Cabtel Corp., which operated as La Cabine Telephonique in Quebec, and The Telephone Booth in Alberta and Ontario. The deal added 49 stores to its holdings. In 2007, Glentel reached a multi-year agreement with Costco Canada to operate wireless kiosks, branded as "Wireless, etc." at its locations.

In 2010, the company first expanded into the United States with its acquisition of Diamond Wireless, a chain of Verizon Wireless retailers. In 2012, it acquired an 83% majority stake in AMT Group, an Australian operator of mobile retailers under the Allphones and Virgin Mobile brands. That year, Glentel acquired the U.S. firm Automotive Technologies Inc., doing business as Wireless Zone, which operated 421 Verizon Wireless retailers, for $83.3 million. Glentel also reached a deal to operate Target Mobile kiosks at the short-lived Target Canada chain.

=== Acquisition by Bell and Rogers ===
On November 28, 2014, Bell Canada announced that it would acquire Glentel for $670 million, pending regulatory and shareholder approval, in an effort to boost its retail presence. Bell also operates first-party retail outlets for its services, and owns The Source, a Canadian electronics store chain that also sells Bell services. The company planned to continue serving as a retailer for non-Bell brands after the acquisition was completed.

On December 17, 2014, Rogers Communications filed for an injunction against Glentel in the Ontario Superior Court, seeking to have the acquisition blocked. It argued that pursuant to Glentel's supply agreements with the company, Rogers had to consent to any change in company ownership. The company also foresaw the possibility of Glentel's retailers showing favouritism towards Bell brands following the merger. Glentel CEO Tom Skidmore disputed Rogers' complaint, stating that "Rogers has the right to remove their products from our Canadian stores if they choose to terminate its agreement with us, but has no right under its agreement to block the acquisition of Glentel."

On December 24, 2014, Bell announced that it had agreed to divest a 50% stake in Glentel to Rogers upon its completion of the acquisition. The acquisition was completed on May 6, 2015.

In 2016, Wireless Zone was sold to Round Room, LLC. Diamond Wireless was also sold to A Wireless. In February 2017, Allphones went into receivership after being sold to a "Canadian shareholder" in May 2016.
