= SaskTel =

Canadian telecommunications company

Saskatchewan Telecommunications Holding Corporation
- Trade name: SaskTel
- Formerly: Saskatchewan Government Telephones
- Type: Crown corporation
- Industry: Telecommunications
- Founded: June 12, 1908; 118 years ago (as Department of Railways, Telegraphs and Telephones); June 1, 1947; 79 years ago (as Saskatchewan Government Telephones)
- Headquarters: 2121 Saskatchewan Drive; Regina, Saskatchewan; S4P 3Y2
- Area served: Saskatchewan; Canada
- Key people: Jeremy Harrison, Minister Responsible for SaskTel; Charlene Gavel, President and CEO; Grant Kook, Chair of the Board of Directors
- Revenue: ▲CA$1.3 billion
- Owner: Government of Saskatchewan
- Number of employees: 3,242
- Subsidiaries: DirectWest; SaskTel International; SecurTek
- ASN: 803
- Website: www.sasktel.com

Saskatchewan Telecommunications Holding Corporation, operating as SaskTel, is a Canadian telecommunications crown corporation based in the province of Saskatchewan. Owned by the provincial government, it provides wireline and wireless communications services, including landline telephone, mobile networks, broadband internet (including copper DSL, fibre to the home, and wireless broadband), IPTV, and security services. Through a subsidiary, SaskTel International, the company has also worked on telecom infrastructure projects in countries such as Argentina and the Bahamas, as well as being the lead implementation company for the communication and control systems of the Channel Tunnel between England and France.

As of 2026, SaskTel serves around 1.3 million customers, and has an annual revenue of around CA$1.3 billion.

== History ==
SaskTel was established pursuant to the Telephone Acts as the Department of Railways, Telegraphs and Telephones on June 12, 1908, and through acquisitions of other independent telephone companies (including the Bell Telephone Company of Canada's Saskatchewan operations in 1909) quickly became the dominant government-run telephone operator in Saskatchewan.

On May 9, 1947, premier Tommy Douglas announced that ownership and operational duties for the province's telephone system would be taken over by the newly-established crown corporation Saskatchewan Government Telephones, effective June 1. The change was intended to separate the administrative duties for the telephone system from the government's regulatory duties.

In 1999, SaskTel launched a new Yorkton-based subsidiary known as SecurTek, which deals in security and monitoring services.

In 2002, the company introduced a digital, IPTV-based television service known as Max Entertainment Services, as one of the first such offerings in Canada.

In 2009, SaskTel entered into network sharing agreements with Bell Canada and Telus, while SaskTel has a separate agreement with Rogers to contribute to a national UMTS/HSPA+ cellular network. In July 2010, SaskTel announced an employee trial launch of its CA$170 million HSPA+ network. The services became publicly available August 16 in metropolitan areas such as North Battleford, Moose Jaw, Prince Albert, Regina, Saskatoon, Swift Current, Yorkton, and Weyburn. It launched with a range of BlackBerry and Nokia handsets, and the promise of iPhone carriage in the future.

In August 2012, SaskTel announced that it would construct a fibre to the home (FTTH) network branded as Infinet (stylized infiNET), beginning in portions of Regina and Saskatoon, and other cities over the next seven years. In January 2013, SaskTel announced the launch of an LTE network in the Regina and Saskatoon areas, with plans to extend coverage into other major areas of the province by 2014. As of 2013, the company had recorded nearly 616,000 wireless subscribers and over 100,000 Max TV subscribers.

In July 2015, SaskTel acquired six AWS-1 wireless spectrum licenses from Freedom Mobile.

=== Bill 40 ===
In 2016, Brad Wall's Saskatchewan Party government proposed Bill 40, which allowed for the partial privatization of up to 50% of a provincial crown corporation without seeking public approval. The bill prompted concerns that stakes in SaskTel could be sold to third-parties; the company conducted an independent assessment, factoring in the then-proposed acquisition of former crown telco MTS in Manitoba to Bell Canada. The review found that SaskTel's net income risked "[being] unable to support the level of dividends that have been returned to the province in recent years", citing the possibility of new or enhanced competition among other companies.

Wall promised that any sale of SaskTel shares would be subject to a public referendum; in August 2016, he stated that "if we get an offer and we think it generates a significant amount of money for the province, maybe enough to eliminate our [$4.1 billion] operating debt, if it takes care of the jobs question in Regina, if it provides better coverage, we are at least going to take it to the people and we'll need someone to lead that process."

In May 2017, following the passing of Bill 40, it was reported that representatives of BCE Inc., Rogers Communications, and Telus had been lobbying and in discussions with Dustin Duncan, minister responsible for SaskTel. The company stated that the meetings were regarding ongoing wholesale agreements between the companies, and were unrelated to privatization.

In August 2017, Wall announced that he would repeal Bill 40.

=== 2017-2020 ===
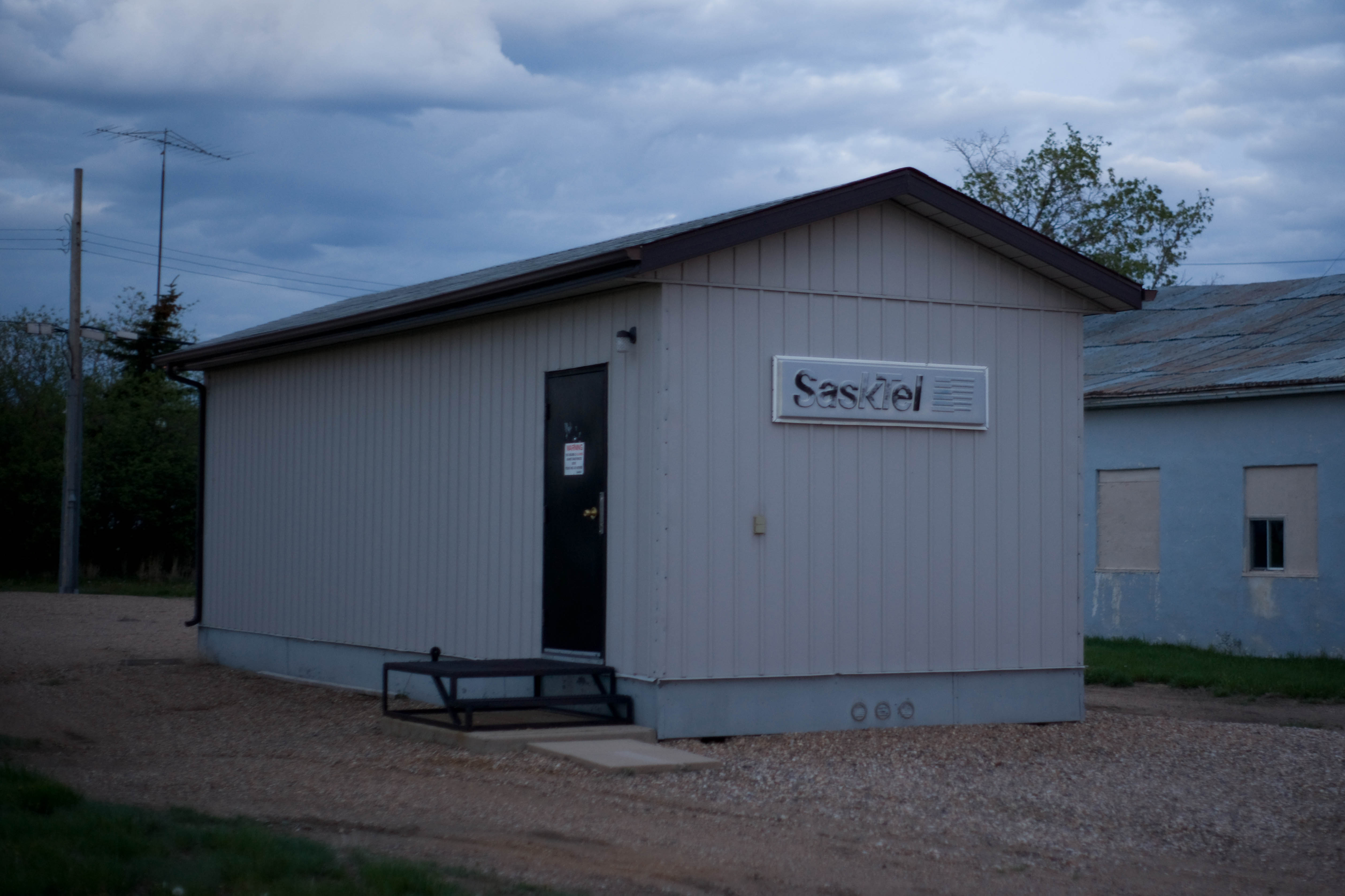
SaskTel facility in the village of Cadillac

SaskTel shut down its CDMA network in July 2017. In August 2017, SaskTel announced that it would build FTTH in Rosthern, Saskatchewan (which lies between Saskatoon and Prince Albert). The deployment was part of a pilot program for deploying the service in portions of Saskatchewan's rural regions. It also launched a new suite of smart home and home security products in conjunction with SecurTek and Alarm.com.

In April 2018, SaskTel's directory division DirectWest expanded into out-of-home advertising through the purchase of digital billboards.

In May 2018, SaskTel announced a capital investment of $301 million into improvements to its services over the next year, with $61.2 million going towards FTTH deployment for 22,000 additional customers, $26.5 million on improvements to its wireless network, and $109.1 million into customer service.

In August 2018, SaskTel launched MaxTV Stream, a new skinny-bundle IPTV service, utilizing the Ericsson MediaFirst platform running as an app on Android TV boxes. On launch the service was available in all SaskTel FTTH markets, as well as 11 rural communities.

On February 21, 2019, SaskTel announced that all customers who have internet access will be migrated to electronic billing, in a process that began March 27.

==== Unifor strike ====
On October 4, 2019, 5,000 Unifor workers representing seven Saskatchewan crown corporations, including SaskTel and two subsidiaries, went on strike. SaskTel stated that this strike would not affect service for its customers (including online billing and account management via the mySaskTel website), but that first-party SaskTel retail stores will be closed for the duration, and that customers would be unable to activate new home services or transfer them to new residences. After initially picketing outside of the Saskatchewan Party's convention, workers picketed outside of SaskTel's call centre in Regina on October 8—preventing managers from entering.

The same day, Unifor stated its intent to return to a work-to-rule action on October 8 without a new deal. However, SaskTel announced that it would not allow the unionized workers to return, as "unknown and intermittent walkouts" could compromise the quality of service (Unifor stated that it would only provide 24 hours' notice of any future walkout). In solidarity, the remaining employees in the strike (representing crown corporations such as SaskPower) chose to not return to work either.

In October 2019, SaskTel and Unifor reached a tentative agreement, pending ratification, and work by employees resumed on October 22, 2019. On November 15, 2019, Unifor announced that the agreement was ratified by SaskTel employees.

=== 2020s ===
On June 24, 2020, SaskTel announced that it will not use Huawei equipment for its 5G services, citing a desire to remain uniform with its roaming partners of Bell and Telus (which both chose Ericsson as supplier). On March 15, 2021, SaskTel announced that it would begin a preliminary deployment of 5G service in Regina and Saskatoon by the end of 2021, with Samsung Electronics serving as the sole supplier of equipment for the network. To support the deployment, Samsung Electronics later announced that it would open a regional office in Regina.

In December 2021, SaskTel announced a new self-service prepaid MVNO known as Lüm Mobile; minister responsible for SaskTel Don Morgan explained that the service was meant to be comparable to Bell, Rogers, and Telus's flanker brands Lucky Mobile, Chatr, and Public Mobile.

On January 17, 2023, SaskTel announced that it would begin charging an additional fee of $1.95 per-month for its sasktel.net email services effective April 2023. However, following criticism of the decision by customers and government officials, Morgan "instructed" the company to backpedal on the plans.

In June 2024, SaskTel announced that at least half of its existing network footprint had been upgraded to 5G service. September 2024 saw 5G expansions focused on 50 rural and Indigenous communities.

In October 2024, SaskTel filed with the Federal Court of Appeal to challenge a CRTC ruling requiring that it share access to its last mile fibre-optic networks with competitors on a wholesale basis. SaskTel cited that the CRTC decision failed to factor in the company's market position and mandates in comparison to other incumbent ISPs the decision primarily targeted, and that allowing third-party access to its network would marginalize its investments.

In February 2026, SaskTel announced that it would phase out its 3G network by October 2027 only supporting 4G and 5G devices with Voice over LTE moving forward.

== Marketing ==
SaskTel is a sponsorship partner for the Canadian Football League's Saskatchewan Roughriders, and was named as a "founding partner" of the new Mosaic Stadium in Regina upon its opening in 2016. In August 2014, SaskTel acquired the naming rights to Saskatoon's Credit Union Centre, and renamed it SaskTel Centre. It was also title sponsor of the Saskatchewan Jazz Festival in Saskatoon for several years. SaskTel's final year as title sponsor was in 2025.

From 2007 until 2016, SaskTel's marketing prominently featured 3D-animated characters such as Little Red, the Wolf, and Gainer the goldfish (named after the Saskatchewan Roughriders' mascot). In December 2016, the company introduced a new branding campaign, "Today is The Day".

The company re-launched its anti-cyberbullying awareness campaign, I Am Stronger, as Be Kind Online in February 2019.

== Networks ==
=== Radio frequency summary ===
Frequencies used on the SaskTel Network
Frequency range	Band number	Protocol	Class	Status	Note(s)
1900 MHz PCS	2	UMTS/HSPA/HSPA+/DC-HSPA+	3G	Being Discontinued	
850 MHz CLR	5	UMTS/HSPA/HSPA+/DC-HSPA+	3G	Being Discontinued	
1900 MHz PCS	2/25	LTE/LTE-A	4G	Active / Being deployed	
1700 MHz AWS	4/66	LTE/LTE-A	4G	Active / Being deployed	
850 MHz CLR	5	LTE/LTE-A	4G	Active / Being deployed	
2600 MHz IMT-E	7	LTE/LTE-A	4G	Active / Being deployed	
700 MHz Upper SMH Block C1	13	LTE/LTE-A	4G	Active / Being deployed	
600 MHz DD	71	LTE/LTE-A	4G	Active / Being deployed	
1700 MHz AWS	n66	NR	5G	Active / Being deployed	
3500 MHz C-Band	n78	NR	5G	Active / Being deployed	
