= Fido (wireless carrier) =

Cellular Carrier

Fido Solutions Inc.
- Type: Subsidiary
- Industry: Wireless telecommunications
- Founded: October 25, 1996; 29 years ago
- Headquarters: Place Bonaventure, Montreal, Quebec, Canada
- Products: Wireless; Mobile phone
- Services: Mobile communications
- Revenue: ▲CA$1.02 billion
- Net income: ▲CA$800 million
- Total assets: ▲CA$3.4 billion
- Number of employees: 20,000
- Parent: Rogers Communications
- Website: www.fido.ca

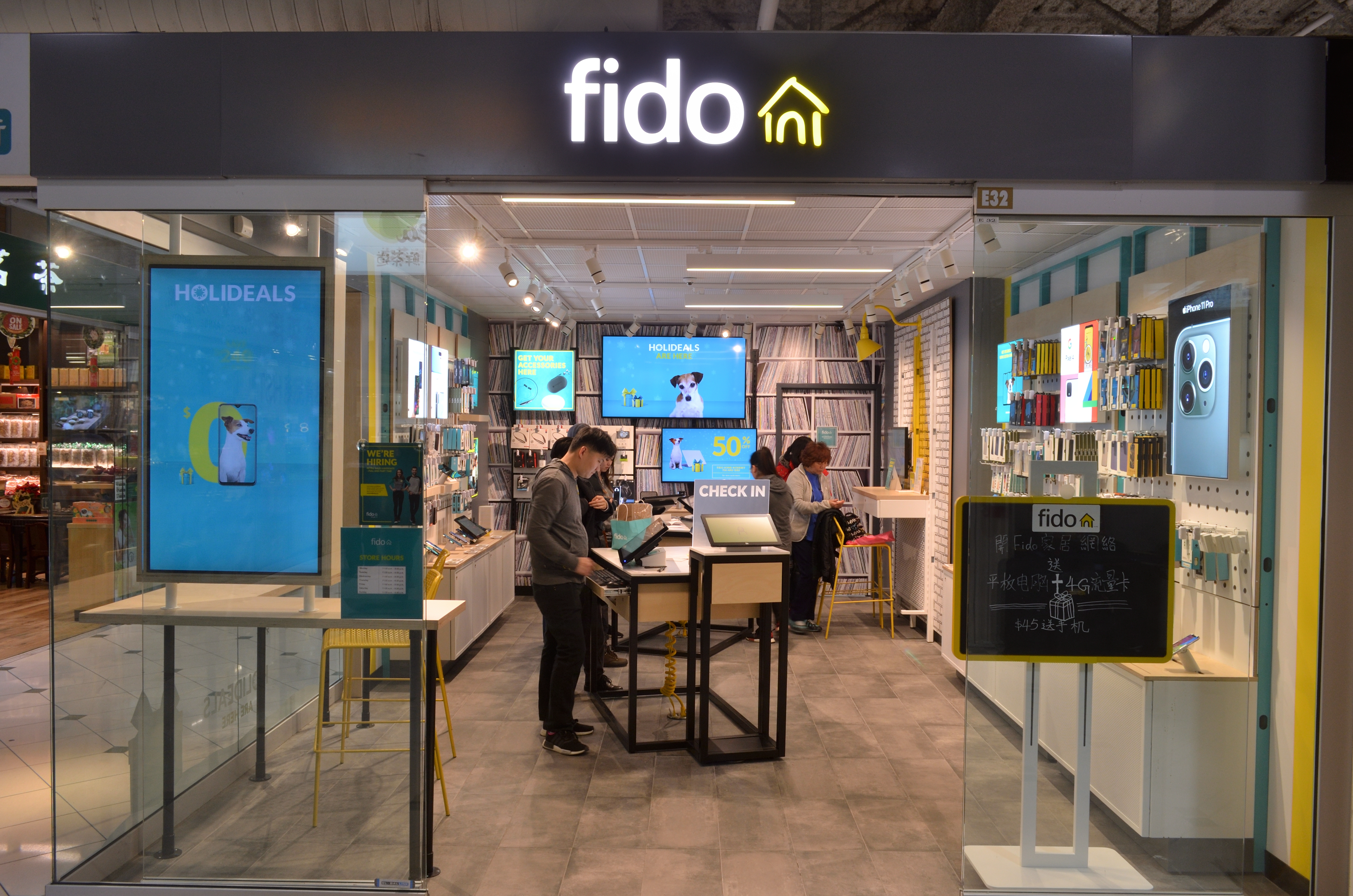
Fido at Pacific Mall

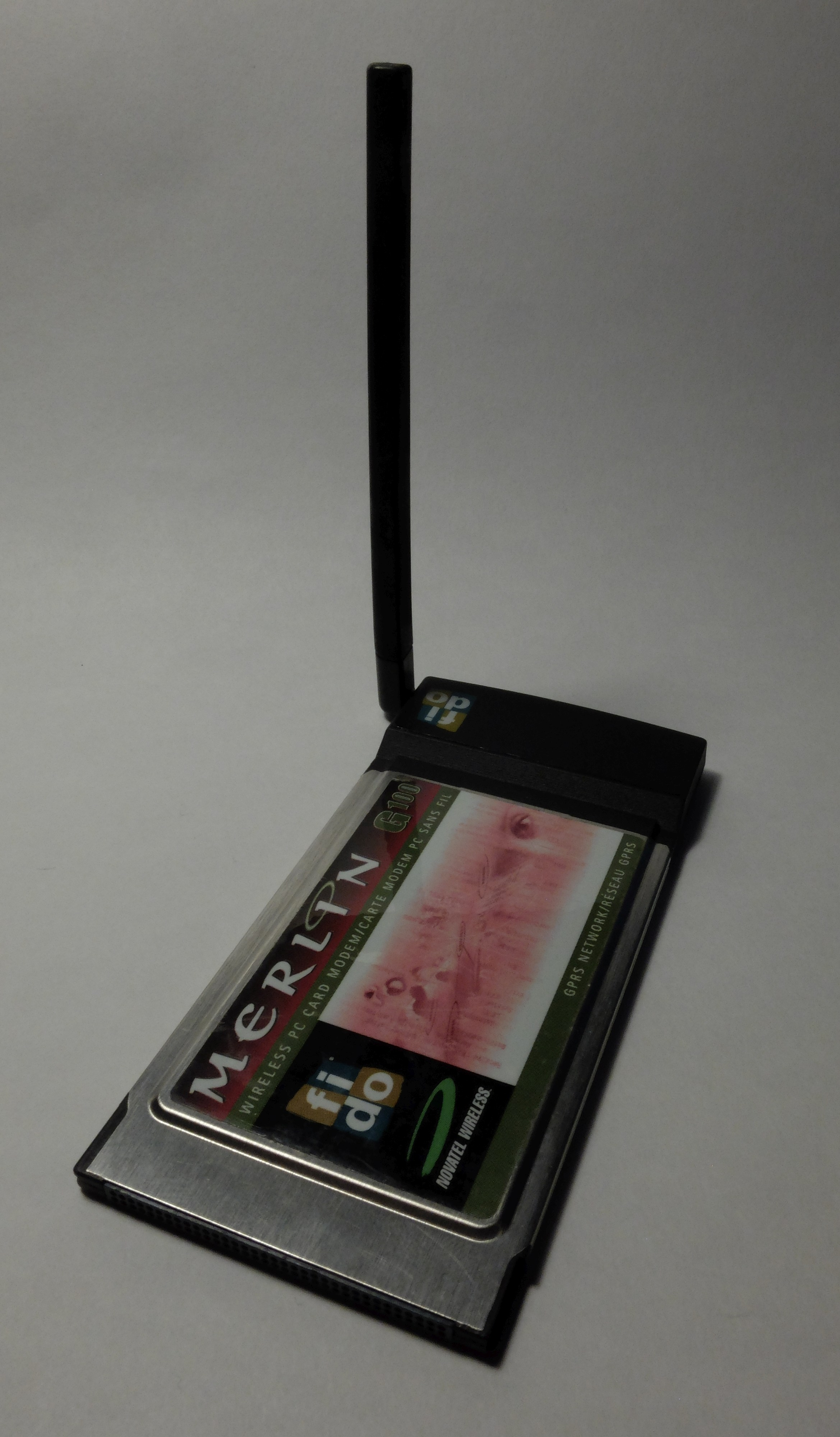
Novatel G100, the first GSM/GPRS PC Card modem available in Canada

Fido Solutions Inc. is a Canadian mobile network operator owned by Rogers Communications. Since its acquisition by Rogers in 2004, it has operated as a Mobile virtual network operator (MVNO) using the Rogers Wireless network.

Fido pioneered the concept of providing unlimited service in select Canadian cities. Fido was the first carrier in Canada to launch a GSM-based network and the first wireless service provider in North America to offer General Packet Radio Service (GPRS) on its network.

== History ==
Fido Solutions was founded in 1996 by Microcell Telecommunications. Fido was the first provider in Canada to offer a network with the GSM standard. The original development of Fido was funded in part by Voicestream, now T-Mobile US.

=== Logo ===
Fido's logo is a yellow doghouse. The name, "Fido," was suggested to Microcell Telecommunications, the first importer of GSM technology from Europe to Canada, on the recommendation of its marketing-communications agency at the time, BOS (Beauchesne, Ostiguy, Simard) of Montreal (now DentsuBos). The agency had been searching for a name that would appeal to both French- and English-speaking consumers. The brand name "Fido" inevitably led to the use of dogs in its commercials, which became the brand's informal trademark in TV advertising, starting in 1995. During the 2000s it ran ads where the narrator finished by catching a jumping dog and saying "regrettably, only from Fido". As of 2017, the tagline is "Go get it."

=== Acquisition by Rogers ===
In November 2004, Microcell was acquired by the other competing GSM carrier, Rogers Communications, for an estimated CA$1.4 billion. At the time of acquisition, Fido had 1,275,094 customers. The company's name was changed to Fido Solutions shortly thereafter. Fido has retained its data roaming service with T-Mobile. Shortly thereafter, Rogers Communications also bought Sprint Canada, a telecom services reseller that was an MVNO partner with Microcell. As of May 2013, Fido had a customer base of 3,372,763 customers, making it Canada's fourth-largest wireless carrier.

=== 2022 outage ===
In July 2022, during the Rogers Communications outage, many Fido customers experienced issues with mobile services. The issue was eventually resolved on July 8 and compensation was promised to customers.

== Network ==
Fido now operates as an MVNO of Rogers. Fido customers will see "Fido" as the network name, and Rogers customers will see "ROGERS" as the network name.

Since its inception, the Fido network ran on GSM. This GSM compatibility continues to exist today. The current result is the integration of the Fido network into the Rogers Wireless network after the acquisition by Rogers. Fido is phasing out older technologies (1900 MHz) on their 2G and 3G networks; despite this matter, Fido network continues to support 2G devices on 850 MHz band only.

== Services ==
Since the company's inception, Fido offered unique services to differentiate itself from its competitors. Notably, its CityFido plans include either multiple or unlimited local calling minutes in certain zones throughout Canada. Fido was also the country's first and last mobile service provider to bill postpaid airtime by the second, while other companies round up calls to the next minute except for some grandfathered customers.

=== Voice plans ===
On November 4, 2008, Fido announced a re-branding and subsequent relaunch of their services due to competition from Koodo Mobile. This re-positioned the company as a discount wireless brand, offering postpaid plans virtually identical to those of Koodo with no system access fee or carrier-charged "911 fee". Clients using legacy plans, however, may keep them only if they continue to pay both fees. Current plans include 100, 200, 300, 500 or unlimited minutes incoming and outgoing calls (Canada-wide calls). The $50 unlimited plan replaces the previously available CityFido plans.

Starting in 2018, Canadian wireless carriers, including Fido, changed the way they offer plans and devices, by separating the cost of each aspect. Previously, plan and device costs were bundled together as one price. This reduced transparency for consumers and made it difficult to understand. However, this new idea of "device financing" is currently being reviewed by the CRTC.

December 5, 2018, Fido confirmed customers are able to purchase wireless plans with eSIM. Customers with the eSIM enabled smartphones and devices can purchase the eSIM voucher online and connect to the network.

As of November 2019, Fido' allows customers to pick a rate plan with different usage limits for talk, text and data. After which the user can choose a new device if interested as well as how much of the device cost they like to pay upfront.

=== Home internet ===
In November 2015, Fido began to offer cable internet services in selected markets. The service is a re-branded Rogers Hi-Speed Internet, offering a 30 Mbit/s package with a 300 GB bandwidth cap, with discounts as part of bundles with Fido post-paid mobile services. Fido internet is available to markets in Ontario that are served by Rogers' internet. The service is primarily aimed at millennials.

=== Perks ===
As the FidoDOLLARS program was wound down, July 2017 saw the introduction of Fido's +5 Hours of Data, allowing customers on a pulse plan to enable 1 free hour of data, 5 individual times during each billing cycle. In May 2018, Fido introduced Fido XTRA which provides customers with perks from various retailers every Thursday, but Fido XTRA discontinued in 2023 .

=== Discontinued services ===
Fido once offered a wide range of services which it no longer offers. These have been discontinued either following the purchase of Fido by Rogers, or during "The New Fido" rebranding era.

Unlimited mobile broadband while in Canada or the United States, older CityFido plans and Sprint Canada bundles were some of the plan options removed after Rogers purchased Microcell. The unlimited mobile Internet access plans were replaced by tiered and rationed Internet access options, although feature phones were still eligible for unlimited access until early 2012. Only some legacy CityFido plans were grandfathered, and Fido now has new CityFido offerings. Sprint Canada bundles with Fido were temporarily replaced by Better Choices Bundles after Rogers purchased both companies.

Better Choices Bundles, couples plans, Danger Hiptop service, fax messaging, FullFido plans and mobile TV were all discontinued after "The New Fido" re-branding. Only some existing FullFido customers were grandfathered. The Better Choices Bundles program once offered up to 15% off a pre-tax Fido monthly bill when combined with one or more Rogers services, but Fido is now listed as a "service[] that do[es]n't qualify for the Better Choices Bundles Program". Couples plans were replaced by Circle Calling in 2011. Fax messaging was discontinued on September 22, 2007, but fax numbers could be ported out until December 22 of that year, and a similar service is still available at competitor Mike. The Mobile TV service offered up to 25 channels, but was discontinued due to a lack of subscribers. Competitors Bell Mobility and its MVNO Virgin Mobile Canada both offer a very similar feature called Bell Mobile TV.

Per-second billing on Fido's postpaid monthly plans was discontinued on July 4, 2012. Customers with plans created and activated before that date are kept on per-second billing until they change to a newer plan.

The company changed their plan offerings, now bundling data with their Smart plans, and Max Plans. CityFido plans had a cost of $35 per month and are available in ten select CityFido zones throughout Canada. Unlimited features included incoming calls, outgoing local calls, international SMS text messages and BlackBerry Messenger (BBM) service while inside any CityFido zone.

In January 2016, Fido announced the termination of the FidoDOLLARS program. The earning of FidoDOLLARS ends on or shortly after April 6, 2016, for non-term monthly plans, and ends at the end of the current term for those FidoDOLLARS-earning plans that are on a contracted term. The non-term monthly customers were then told to use up (redeem) their FidoDOLLARS by July 6, 2016, whereas customers on a FidoDOLLARS-earning contracted term could redeem their FidoDOLLARS by July 6, 2018 (or else lose the FidoDOLLARS balance in both cases). Fido customers with multiple lines are deemed to be in the second category if at least one line is on a FidoDOLLARS-earning contracted term that goes beyond April 6, 2016. Many users in their community expressed dissatisfaction at the "scam" that their value had been arbitrarily taken by the company, or the only viable redemption option required a further contract.

Fido prepaid services, known as Fidomatic until 2001, were launched during the Microcell era and maintained with the carrier's acquisition by Rogers. In October 2024, Rogers announced the upcoming closure of Fido and Rogers prepaid services, recommending its prepaid subsidiary Chatr for new customers. On February 20, 2025, all prepaid services from the Fido and Rogers brands were discontinued, with existing accounts transferred to Chatr.

== Retail presence ==
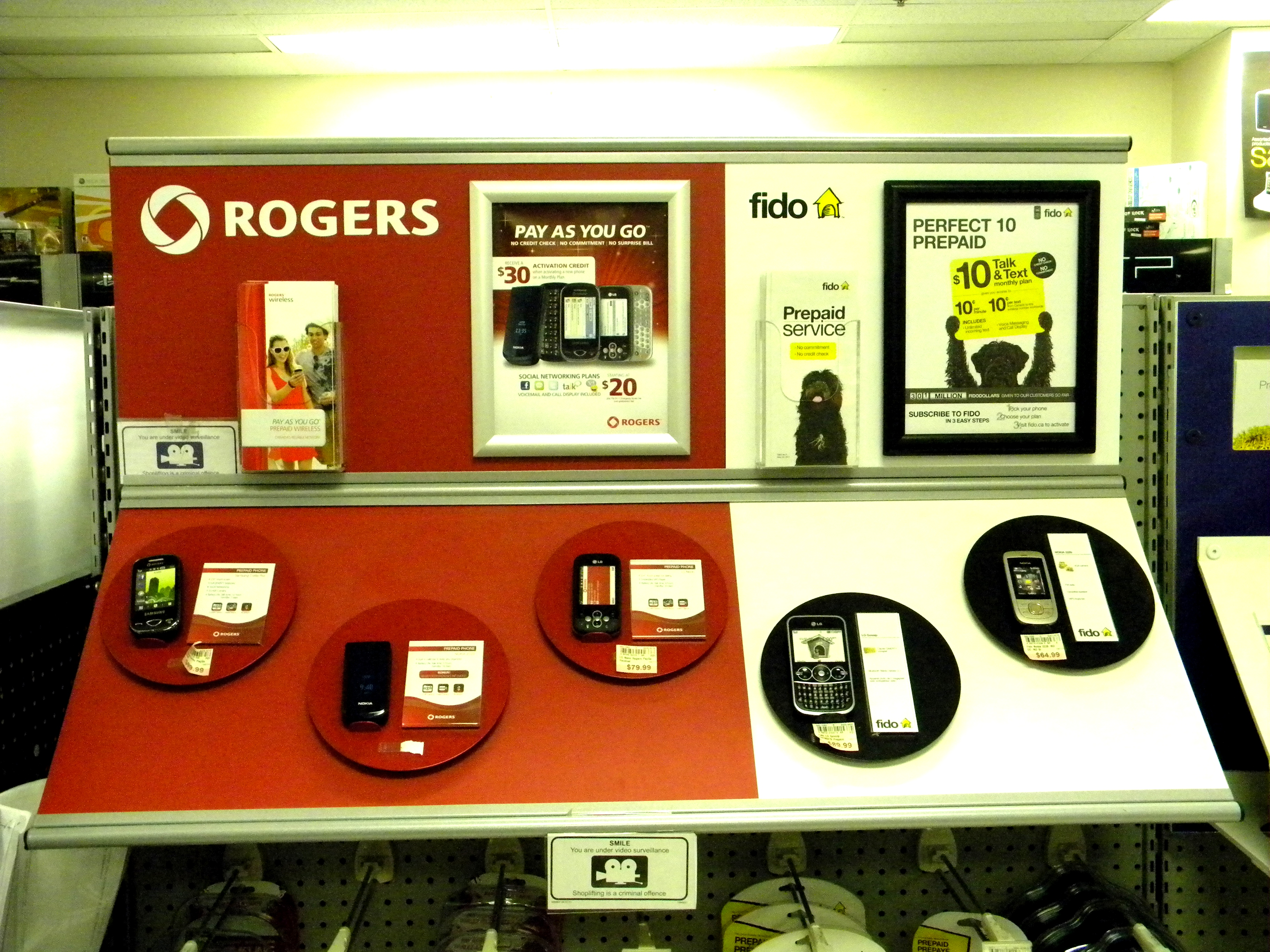
Rogers and Fido phones at Zellers

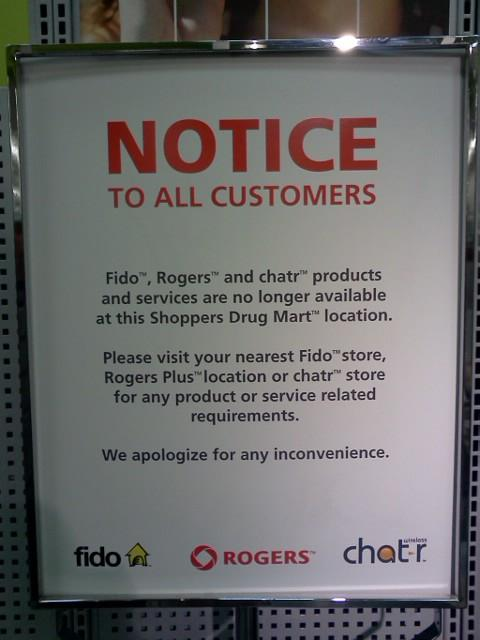
A sign of Fido, Rogers, and Chatr at Shoppers Drug Mart

Fido has its own corporate retail stores, and also allows third parties to become exclusive dealers. For example, Best Buy, Costco, Tbooth, Walmart and WirelessWave sell Fido products along with prepaid and postpaid services. Additionally, Loblaw Companies and Zellers stores sold prepaid feature phones and top-up vouchers. Loblaw stores have a special booth, called The Mobile Shop, where the phones are displayed.

=== Former retailers ===
While Shoppers Drug Mart carried only Rogers Wireless prepaid phones at one time, the stores temporarily partnered with Rogers. As a result, Shoppers stores added both prepaid and postpaid products and services for Rogers and its two other brands, Fido and Chatr. Customers could also try out the iPhone 4. As of March 2011, however, Shoppers Drug Mart stores ended their partnership. They now only sell prepaid top-up vouchers for these providers.

== See also ==
- List of Canadian mobile phone companies
- List of internet service providers in Canada
