= Lucky Mobile =

Canadian prepaid mobile virtual network operator

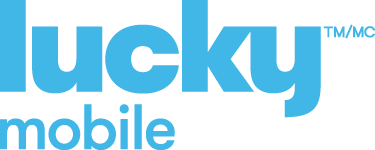

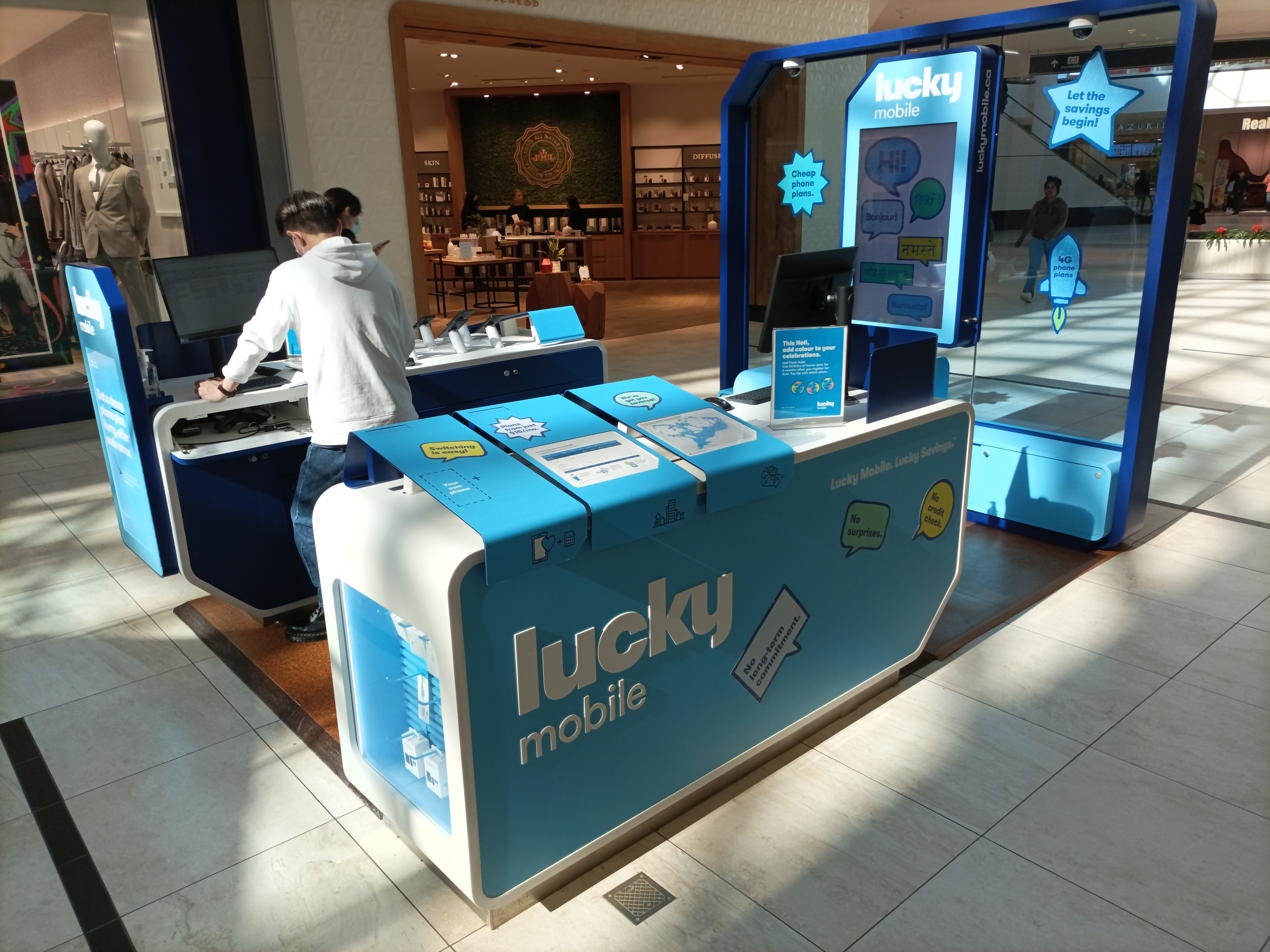
- Type: Subsidiary
- Industry: Mobile virtual network operator
- Founded: December 4, 2017; 8 years ago
- Areas served: Canada
- Products: Budget Android smartphones; Flip phones; SIM cards
- Services: 4G data; SMS; Mobile calling
- Parent: Bell Canada
- Website: www.luckymobile.ca

Lucky Mobile is a Canadian prepaid mobile virtual network operator and a subsidiary of Bell Canada. Founded in December 2017, Lucky Mobile operates on the Bell Mobility network alongside fellow subsidiary Virgin Plus. It targets the same market segment as discount mobile brands Chatr (owned by Rogers Communications) and Public Mobile (owned by Telus).

== History ==
After being announced on December 1, 2017, Lucky Mobile launched on December 4. At launch, the network is available for users in 17 metro areas in Canada. The launch was viewed as a way for BCE to compete with the discount mobile brands Chatr and Public Mobile operated by its competitors Rogers Communications and Telus, respectively. Like Chatr, Lucky Mobile offers a limited selection of low end smartphones for sale outright. In March 2018, the carrier's service area expanded to include Saskatchewan and Manitoba.

== Network ==
Lucky Mobile operates as a mobile virtual network operator offering pre-paid calling, texting, and 4G throttled speed data running on Bell Mobility's 5G network with pre-paid plans in Canada.

Customers with eSIM enabled smartphones and devices are able to purchase eSIM from Lucky Mobile and connect to the network without a physical SIM card.

== Retail presence ==
Lucky Mobile SIM cards are sold in Bell, Virgin Plus, Visions Electronics, Walmart, Circle K, Glentel (T-Booth Wireless, Wireless Wave), Best Buy, Best Buy Express, Staples, Giant Tiger and Dollarama locations.
