= Rogers Wireless =

Canadian mobile network operator

Rogers Wireless Inc.
- Formerly: Cantel; Cantel AT&T; Rogers Cantel AT&T; Rogers AT&T Wireless
- Type: Subsidiary
- Industry: Mobile network operator
- Founded: February 4, 1983; 43 years ago
- Founder: Ted Rogers; David Margolese; Marc Belzberg; Philippe de Gaspé Beaubien
- Headquarters: Toronto, Ontario, Canada
- Key people: Dirk Woessner, president
- Services: NR, LTE, UMTS (including HSPA), GSM (including SMS, GPRS, and EDGE)
- Revenue: $15.1 billion CAD (2018)
- Net income: $585 million CAD (2018)
- Number of employees: 24,500 (2017)
- Parent: Rogers Communications
- Website: rogers.com/wireless

Rogers Wireless Inc. is a Canadian mobile network operator headquartered in Toronto, providing service nationally throughout Canada. It is a wholly owned subsidiary of Rogers Communications. The company had revenues of just under $15.1 billion in 2018. Rogers Wireless is the largest wireless carrier in Canada, with 12.5 million subscribers as of Q2 2024.

The company was originally started by David Margolese as an expansion of his pager firm, Canadian Telecom, formed in 1978. With the 1983 introduction of AMPS, the first North American standard for cell phones, Margolese started plans to expand the company into this new market. This required large amounts of capital. A group of private investors consisting of Margolese, Ted Rogers, Marc Belzberg and Philippe de Gaspé Beaubien formed the newly renamed Cantel in 1984 and opening for service in July 1985.

Rogers purchased a controlling interest in the company in 1986, and bought out all of the shares of the other members by 1990. Starting in 1984, he also purchased an increasing share of CNCP Telecommunications, who operated a number of microwave relay networks suitable for carrying long distance calls. AT&T purchased a share of the new company, which also allowed Cantel to avoid using Bell Canada lines for access into the U.S. where possible. In 2003, the company was renamed Rogers Wireless, and in 2004 Rogers bought out AT&T's remaining shares. The same year, Rogers purchased Microcell Solutions, today known as Fido, Canada's first user of GSM systems as opposed to the more widespread (in North America) CDMA. The company then expanded GSM service throughout their network.

Rogers Wireless has remained Canada's leading wireless provider throughout its history. This was aided in its early Cantel years by the slow uptake of cellular service by Bell Canada and the limited capital of smaller players like BC Tel and Shaw Communications. The use of GSM proved to be a major boon when the iPhone was released in 2007 and only ran on GSM. This handed the company exclusive access to this product until 2009 when Bell Mobility and Telus Mobility agreed to share towers and switch/upgrade to UMTS/HSPA in time to capture the lucrative international market as part of the 2010 Winter Olympics. Today, Rogers retains its preeminent position with widespread service, continued acquisitions, and the use of fighter brands like Fido and Chatr.

== History ==
Rogers Wireless logo prior to 2015 redesign

Rogers Wireless was founded by Ted Rogers, David Margolese, Marc Belzberg and Philippe de Gaspé Beaubien.

In 1978, future Sirius XM Radio founder David Margolese dropped out of university and founded the paging company Canadian Telecom. Foreseeing that cellular wireless technology would be used for more than simply voice calls, Margolese proposed a plan to obtain a licence for Canada’s cellular phone rights. At the time, there were no such licences or commercial cellular services in existence, as the wireless technology was still in the laboratory and experimental.

Needing significant financing, he approached Rogers Communications, which was owned by Ted Rogers, to partner with him. Rogers ultimately joined with Margolese, Marc Belzberg of First City Financial and Telemedia founder Philippe de Gaspé Beaubien to form Cantel, which Margolese named after Canadian Telecom. In 1984, the group was granted Canada’s national cellular licence. Cantel launched service on July 1, 1985.

In 1986, Ted Rogers purchased a controlling stake in Cantel, which was at the time Canada's only national supplier of cellular telephone service. Over the next four years, Rogers bought out his partners, becoming the sole owner of Cantel. Cantel was later renamed Cantel AT&T, Rogers Cantel AT&T and Rogers AT&T Wireless; in December 2003, the company became known by its current name, Rogers Wireless, which led to Rogers purchasing AT&T’s 34% stake in the company for $1.8 billion the following year.

=== Spectrum purchases ===
Through spectrum auctions, Rogers has made the following purchases of spectrum:

Spectrum purchased by Rogers
Auction	Licences won	Total price	Total population covered	Registered as	Ref.
PCS - 2 GHz (2001)	23	$393,520,000	28,556,783	Rogers Wireless Inc.	
2300 & 3500 MHz (2004)	33	$5,912,965	16,221,004	Rogers Wireless Inc.	
2300 & 3500 MHz (residual, 2004-2005)	49	$4,906,765	6,654,716	Rogers Wireless Inc.	
AWS-1 (2008)	59	$999,367,000	30,007,094	Rogers	
700 MHz (2014)	22	$3,291,738,000	33,368,700	Rogers	
2500 MHz (2015)	41	$24,086,270	11,637,606	Rogers Communications Partnership	
600 MHz (2019)	52	$1,725,006,000	35,150,715	Rogers	
3500 MHz (2021)	325	$3,325,600,269	34,955,719	Rogers Communications Canada Inc.	
2500 & 3500 MHz (residual, 2023)	6	$2,669,510	487,007	Rogers Communications Canada Inc.	
3800 MHz (2023)	860	$474,766,132	35,063,601	Rogers Communications Canada Inc.	
3500/3800 MHz (residual, 2024)	1	$6,000	12,480	Rogers Communications Canada Inc.	
3500/3800 MHz (residual, 2026)	30	$84,485,238	1,732,721	Rogers Communications Canada Inc.	

== Networks ==
Rogers operates GSM, UMTS, LTE, and 5G NR networks in all of Canada's provinces and offers roaming in Canada's territories.

=== AMPS ===
Rogers previously operated an AMPS/D-AMPS network in the 850 MHz and 1900 MHz bands in Canada. The network was shut down on May 31, 2007.

=== GSM ===
Since 2002, the company's 2G GSM network with EDGE has operated in Canada. It provides compatibility for GSM-based devices, including those frequently used by international travelers. However, this technology is limited to speeds up to 236 kilobits per second, which is only about four times the speed of dial-up.

The 1900 MHz PCS network was shut down on June 7, 2021. 850 MHz was retired on December 31, 2021, for business class IoT devices. The GSM network will be fully decommissioned by November 30, 2027.

=== UMTS ===
In 2006, Rogers became the first Canadian carrier to operate a 3G UMTS/HSPA network, which was upgraded to HSPA+ in 2009. Enhancements included download speeds of up to a theoretical 21 Mbit/s. Further enhancements increased the download speeds up to a theoretical 42 Mbit/s. Rogers' UMTS network coverage was in all Canadian provinces and operating on 850 MHz but is in none of the territories. It is impossible to travel between the Pacific and Atlantic coasts in Canada without encountering a gap in cellular coverage as there are areas lacking cellular coverage in both British Columbia and Ontario. The 1900 MHz PCS network was shut down on June 7, 2021 and the 850 MHz network was shut down on August 7, 2025.

=== LTE ===
In July 2011, Rogers was the first Canadian telecom operator to launch a commercial long-term evolution (LTE) network. In May 2013, Rogers deployed LTE service on its 2600 MHz spectrum in some markets, which the company began marketing as LTE Max. LTE Max is available in a fraction of Rogers' LTE coverage area. On April 17, 2014, Rogers launched LTE service on its 700 MHz spectrum. Rogers has not announced its goals for expanding LTE coverage across Canada, but announced plans in June 2014 to have LTE coverage expanded to 98.3% of the population of British Columbia by the end of 2016. According to Rogers, as of December 31, 2016, its LTE coverage reached 95% of the Canadian population. On March 31, 2015, Rogers Wireless launched voice over LTE (VoLTE), the first carrier in Canada to offer this service. Cat-6 LTE-Advanced has been available since January 2015, through carrier aggregation of band 4 and band 7, with a maximum download speed of 225 Mbit/s.

=== 5G NR ===
Rogers launched its 5G network in January 2020 and uses Block I from the 2500Mhz Frequency Block Plan. The company stated that rollout will expand to use its further reaching 600 MHz spectrum later in the year for improved 5G coverage. As of December 16, 2020, Rogers offers both NSA mode and SA modes in select markets. Rogers was the first Canadian carrier to offer 5G service.

Rogers partnered with Swedish Telecom giant Ericsson to launch its 5G wireless technology. Today, Rogers's 5G network is live in more than 160 communities across Canada, including Calgary, Toronto, Vancouver, Ottawa, and Montreal.

=== Radio frequency summary ===
The following is a list of known frequencies that Rogers employs in Canada:

Frequencies used on the Rogers Network
Frequency range	Band number	Protocol	Class	Status	Notes
850 MHz CLR	5	GSM/GPRS/EDGE	2G	Active	Maintaining for international roaming and compatibility with older devices. To be decommissioned by November 30, 2027.
600 MHz DD	71	LTE/LTE-A/LTE-A Pro	4G	Active / Being Deployed	Being used alongside NR via DSS.
700 MHz Lower SMH A/B/C	12/17	LTE/LTE-A/LTE-A Pro	4G	Active	Additional LTE band for building penetration and rural coverage in select markets. Also being used to provide LTE Advanced coverage.
850 MHz CLR	5	LTE/LTE-A/LTE-A Pro	4G	Active	Used to provide LTE Advanced coverage in select markets.
1.7/2.1 GHz AWS	4/66	LTE/LTE-A/LTE-A Pro	4G	Active	Main LTE band providing complete coverage. Also being used to provide LTE Advanced coverage.
1.9 GHz PCS	2/25	LTE/LTE-A/LTE-A Pro	4G	Active	Used to provide LTE Advanced coverage in select markets. Also used for LTE based NTN satellite coverage.
2.6 GHz IMT-E	7/38	LTE/LTE-A/LTE-A Pro	4G	Active	Additional LTE band for more bandwidth in select markets. Also used to provide LTE Advanced coverage in select markets.
5.2 GHz U-NII	46	LTE/LTE-A/LTE-A Pro	4G	Active	License Assisted Access (LAA). Additional capacity in select cities.
600 MHz DD	n71	NR	5G	Active / Being Deployed	SA (standalone) mode since Dec. 2020; in use with Dynamic Spectrum Sharing (DSS)
1.9 GHz PCS	n2	NR	5G	Active / Being Deployed	SA (standalone) mode; in use with Dynamic Spectrum Sharing (DSS)
1.7/2.1 GHz Extended AWS	n66	NR	5G	Active / Being Deployed	SA (standalone) mode since Dec. 2020; in use with Dynamic Spectrum Sharing (DSS)
2.5 GHz BRS	n41	NR	5G	Active / Being Deployed	SA (standalone) mode since Dec. 2020
3.5 GHz C-Band	n78	NR	5G	Active / Being Deployed	Spectrum acquired in 2021 auction. Active since June 2022.
3.8 GHz C-Band	n77	NR	5G	Active / Being Deployed	Spectrum acquired in 2023 auction.

== Products ==
Rogers Wireless carries feature phones, and smartphones that support either Android OS or iOS.

== Services ==
=== On Demand Mobile ===
Customers with select smartphones, tablets, computers, LG Smart TVs, Xbox 360 and Xbox One gaming systems can use the Rogers On Demand mobile service, which was renamed Rogers Live before its current incarnation, Rogers Anyplace TV. Rogers Anyplace TV offers TV shows, movies and sports on demand.

=== Discontinued services ===
Rogers Pay As You Go prepaid services were launched during the Cantel AT&T era and maintained under Rogers Wireless. In October 2024, Rogers announced the upcoming closure of its prepaid services, including those under its Fido brand, and recommended its prepaid subsidiary Chatr for new customers. On February 20, 2025, all prepaid services from the Rogers and Fido brands were discontinued, with existing accounts transferred to Chatr.

== Subsidiaries ==
=== Fido ===
In 2004, Rogers bought Canada’s first and, at the time, only other GSM provider, Fido, along with Fido’s partner, Sprint Canada, for a total of $1.4 billion. At the time, Fido had nearly 1.3 million customers. In 2008, Fido was rebranded as a discount mobile virtual network operator with a new logo and cheaper plans.

=== Chatr ===
Rogers launched the Chatr Mobile brand in mid-2010 in response to the emergence of new phone carriers Mobilicity, Public Mobile, and Freedom Mobile (previously Wind Mobile) to directly compete with the new carriers in their coverage areas. Chatr became a cheaper option than Fido, making Fido more of a mid-range offering.

== Retail presence ==
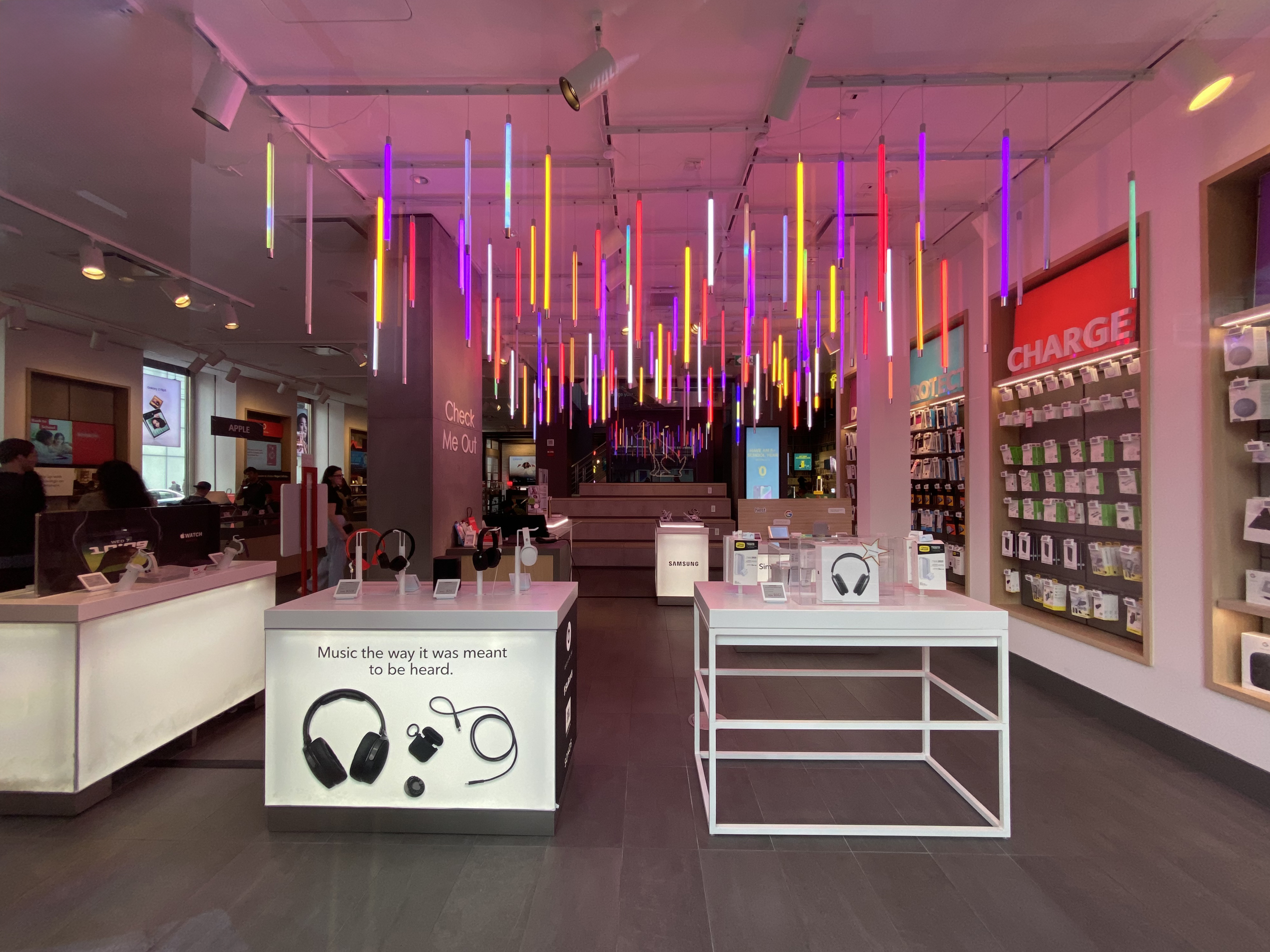
Rogers Retail shop in Yonge Street, Downtown Toronto

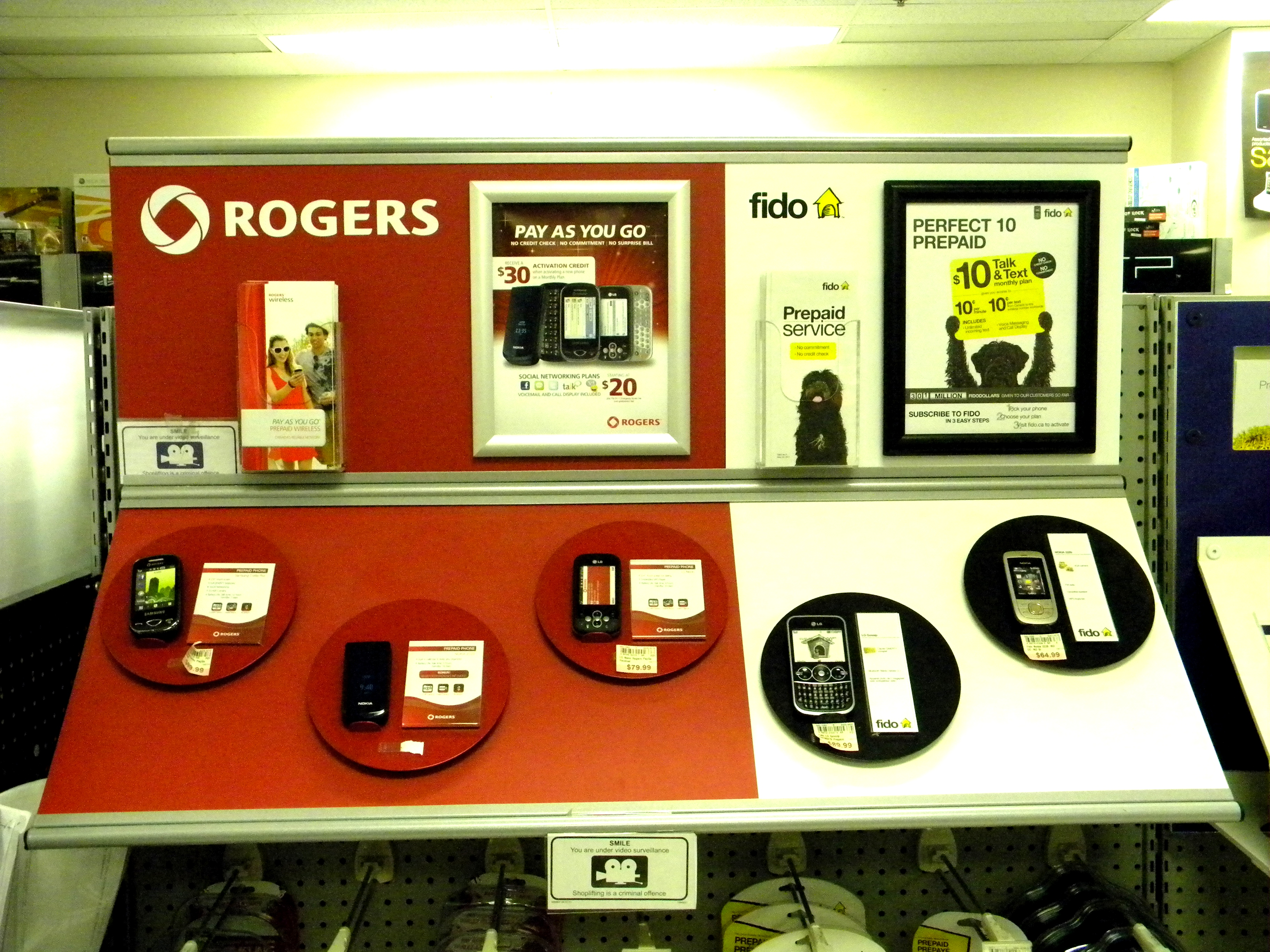
Fido and Rogers phones at Zellers

Rogers has its own corporate retail stores, known as Rogers Plus, and also allows third parties to become exclusive dealers. Best Buy and Walmart stores in Canada provide Fido products along with prepaid and postpaid services. Additionally, Loblaw Companies stores sell prepaid feature phones and top-up vouchers. Loblaw stores have a special booth, called The Mobile Shop, where the phones are displayed.

=== Former retailers ===
While Shoppers Drug Mart carried only Rogers Wireless prepaid phones at one time, the stores temporarily partnered with Rogers. As a result, Shoppers stores added both prepaid and postpaid products and services for Rogers and its two other brands, Fido and Chatr. As of March 2011, however, Shoppers stores ended their partnership. They only sell prepaid top-up vouchers for these providers.

== Criticism ==
=== Misdirected phone charges ===
In 2005, Rogers lost a court case against an Osgoode Hall Law School university professor, Susan Drummond, over a $12,000 charge for overseas calls that was placed on her bill after the phone was stolen, for which the company insisted she pay. Following the case becoming public knowledge, Ted Rogers issued a formal apology and cancelled the charges. Drummond filed a lawsuit, for which she was then also paid punitive and compensatory damages. Drummond and her partner Harry Gefen published further on the case in an SSHRC funded research project, and for which she and her partner were cited by Time magazine as "heroes of the year" in 2007. During her research, Drummond showed that the phones of Rogers executives had been cloned by members of Hezbollah and used to make thousands of overseas phone calls in 1997 and 1998. It also turned up information that Rogers had been allowing phones that they were alerted had potentially fraudulent call patterns to continue to remain functional despite the warning.

=== Text messaging charges ===
On July 7, 2009, Rogers Wireless began charging a nominal fee for incoming text messages to customers without a text messaging plan. The change was similar to policies of charging for incoming text message that were adopted in August 2008 by Bell Mobility and Telus Mobility. Some users complained that Rogers had unilaterally changed the terms of their contracts. The company maintained that changes to services and fees are permitted in the "terms of service" document.

=== Government Regulatory Recovery Fee ===
Rogers has been criticized for its Government Regulatory Recovery Fee (GRRF), formerly known as the System Access Fee (SAF). The fee ranges between $1.93 to $3.35 per month. On July 4, 2012, Rogers announced it would no longer be charging a separate GRRF fee to new customers, instead raising the price of the Monthly Service Charge. The bills of existing customers would remain the same. An $18 billion class action lawsuit against: Bell, Rogers, and Telus, originally filed in a Saskatchewan court in 2004 regarding these hidden fees, is still pending.

=== Anticompetitive tactics ===
Rogers launched the Chatr brand with low-end feature phones and pricing plans similar to that of new entrants such as Wind Mobile, Mobilicity and Public Mobile. Chatr was criticized for being a fighter brand created by Rogers. The brand's "fewer dropped calls" claim was disputed by the Competition Bureau. In 2013, the Ontario Superior Court of Justice ruled that Chatr's advertising of fewer dropped calls, in connection with its 2010 launch, was fair and accurate.

== See also ==
- Fido Solutions
- Chatr
- Mobilicity
- List of Canadian mobile phone companies
