= Bell Mobility =

Canadian wireless network operator

Bell Mobility Inc.
- Formerly: Bell Cellular (1986-1993)
- Type: Subsidiary
- Industry: Mobile network operator
- Founded: 1986; 40 years ago, in Toronto, Ontario, Canada
- Headquarters: Mississauga, Ontario, Canada
- Key people: Blaik Kirby (president); Stephen Howe (CTO)
- Products: Feature phones; Smartphones (Android and iOS); mobile broadband modems
- Services: Mobile telephony; SMS; MMS; mobile broadband (NR; LTE and UMTS)
- Parent: Bell Canada
- Website: bell.ca/mobility

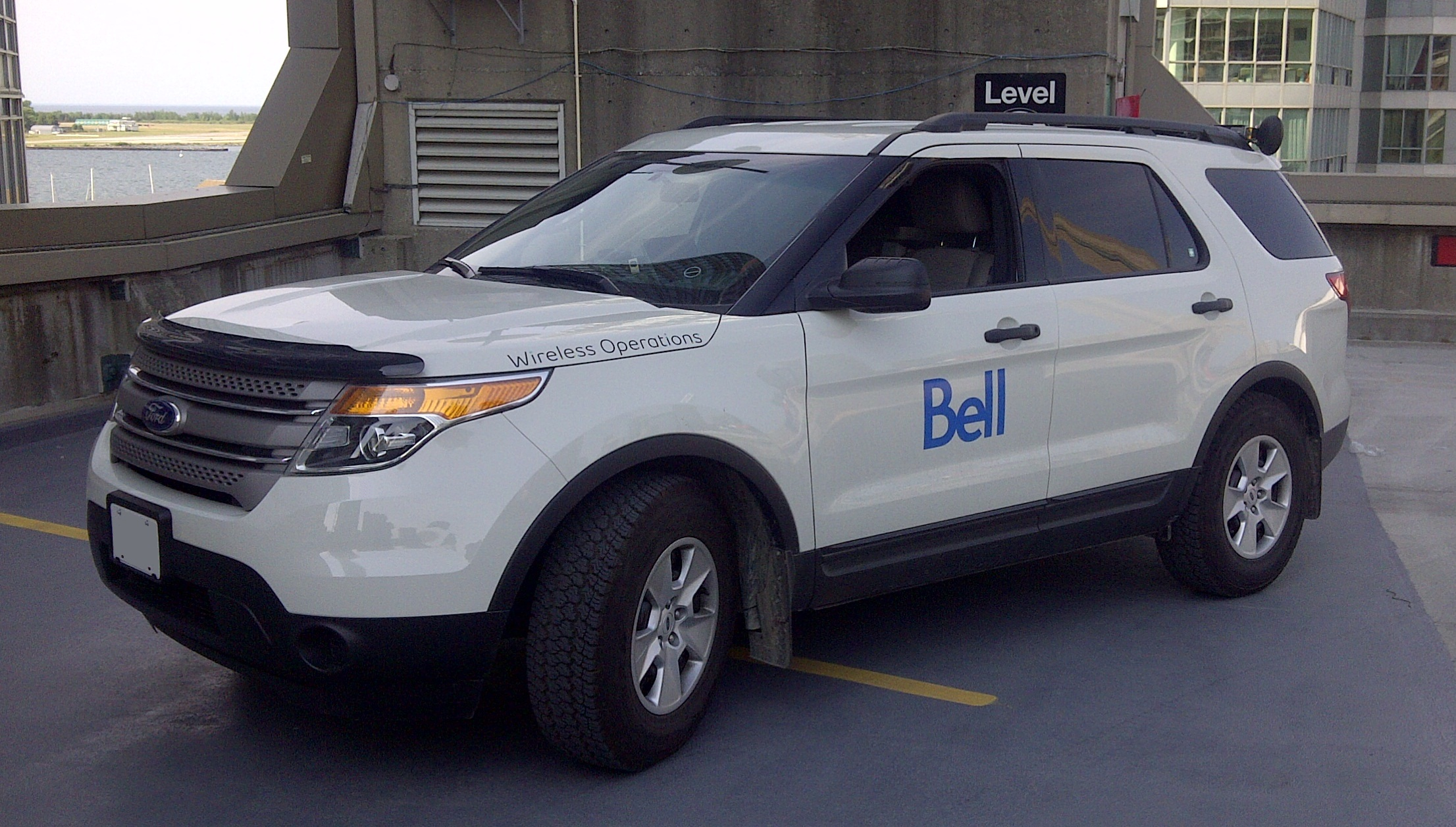
A Bell Mobility Ford Explorer fleet vehicle

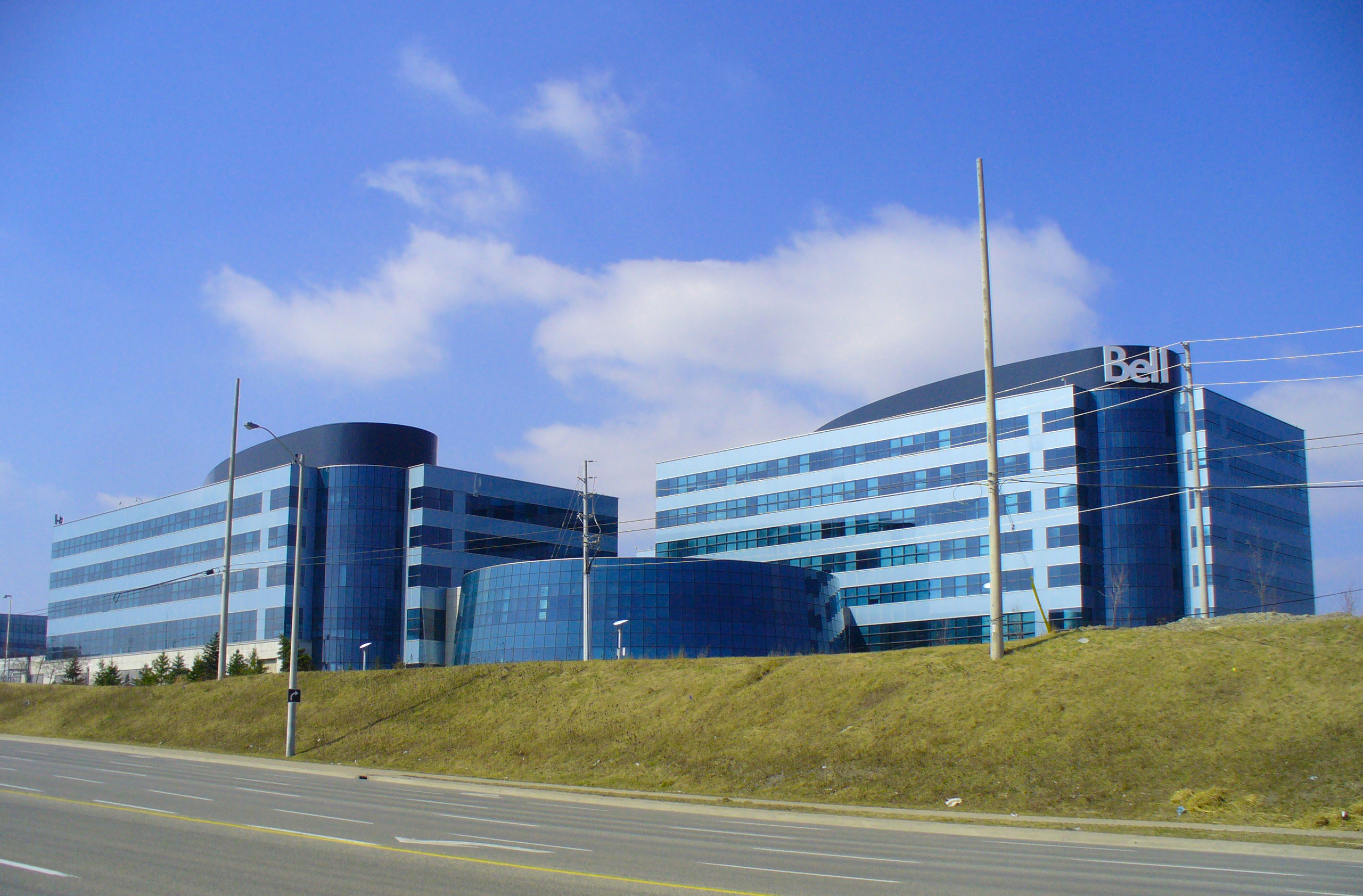
Bell Mobility headquarters in Mississauga, Ontario – "Creekbank Campus"

Bell Mobility Inc. is a Canadian wireless network operator and the division of Bell Canada which offers wireless services across Canada. It operates networks using 5G, LTE and HSPA+ on its mainstream networks. Bell Mobility is the second-largest wireless carrier in Canada, with 11.1 million subscribers as of Q2 2024.

Bell-owned Virgin Mobile Canada as well as Loblaws prepaid PC Telecom, operate as MVNOs on the Bell Mobility network. Some of Bell Canada's regional subsidiaries continue to operate their own wireless networks separate from (but generally allowing for roaming with) Bell Mobility; these are Northwestel (NMI Mobility and Latitude Wireless), Télébec (Télébec Mobilité), and NorthernTel (NorthernTel Mobility).

In July 2006, Bell Mobility assumed responsibility for the former Aliant wireless operations in Atlantic Canada as part of a larger restructuring of both Bell and Aliant, and continued to do business there as Aliant Mobility until re-branding as Bell in April 2008. Bell similarly acquired MTS in Manitoba in 2017, rebranding it as Bell MTS; initially operating autonomously as Bell MTS Mobility, its wireless customers were brought under Bell Mobility in late-2018.

== Networks ==
Although both are different and independent from one another, both the CDMA and UMTS networks use the 850 and 1900 MHz frequencies. Bell's LTE network uses Band 4 Advanced Wireless Services (AWS 1700/2100 MHz) and Band 2 Personal Communications Service (PCS 1900 MHz) in most coverage areas and Band 7 (2600 MHz) in a few areas.

As of April 30, 2019, all CDMA service from Bell has been discontinued.

=== UMTS ===
In October 2009, Telus Mobility and Bell announced plans to deploy HSPA technology by 2010 as part of an effort to eventually upgrade to LTE technology. The network, using largely shared infrastructure, launched on November 4, 2009.

According to Bell, the single-channel HSPA+ network is available to 96% of the Canadian population. It provides download speeds of up to 21 Mbit/s, with typical speeds ranging between 3½ and 8 Mbit/s.

While this network used to operate on the frequencies of 850/1900 MHz, it currently is only active on 1900 MHz.

The HSPA+ network will shut down in Manitoba on March 31, 2026, and a nationwide shutdown will occur on March 1, 2027.

Bell's HSPA+ network coverage is in portions of all Canadian provinces and territories, but it is not possible to drive in Canada between the Pacific coast to the Atlantic coast without going through areas without any cellular coverage, as there are gaps in cellular coverage in British Columbia and Ontario.

=== LTE ===
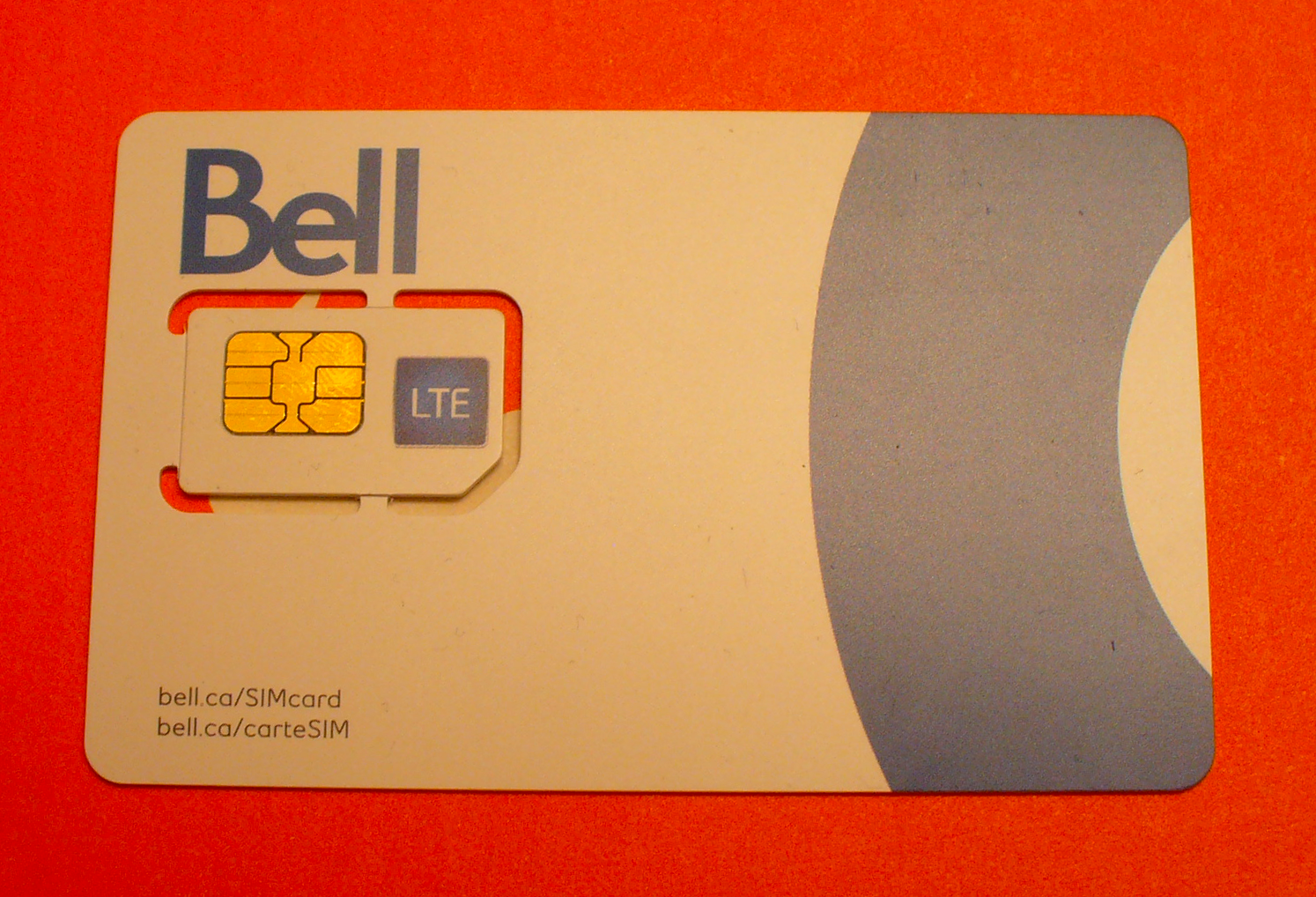
Bell Mobility LTE SIM card

Bell launched LTE by using the 1700 MHz (Band 4) frequency in Toronto and surrounding areas on September 14, 2011. Since then, Bell has expanded LTE into most areas of Canada where it has HSPA coverage, and launched LTE on to the 2600 MHz (Band 7) frequency for additional bandwidth in March 2012 and on to the 700 MHz spectrum (paired bands LTE Band 12/17 and 13 and unpaired Band 29) in 2014. Bell will use either Band 13 or Band 12 depending on provinces.

As of May 2017, LTE coverage reaches 97% of Canada's population, but there are gaps in coverage in smaller communities and between communities, where Bell's HSPA+ network is available but its LTE network is not available.

As of February 2016, Bell Mobility has launched voice over LTE (VoLTE).

=== 5G NR ===
In June 2020, Bell launched 5G services in Calgary, Edmonton, Montreal, Toronto, and Vancouver using 1700 MHz AWS-3 spectrum (band n66). Bell has used equipment from Ericsson and Nokia Networks.

=== Radio frequency summary ===
Frequencies used on the Bell Mobility Network
Frequency range	Band number	Protocol	Generation	Status	Note(s)
1.9 GHz PCS	2	UMTS/HSDPA/HSPA+	3G	Active	Fallback for calls and HSPA+ data. Network to be decommissioned in Manitoba by March 31, 2026. Network to be decommissioned nationwide by March 1, 2027.
600 MHz DD	71	LTE/LTE-A/LTE-A Pro	4G	Active/Being deployed	Spectrum owned by Telus, but can also be used by Bell customers via the RAN sharing agreement.
700 MHz A/B/C/Upper C1-2/D/E	12/13/17/29	LTE/LTE-A/LTE-A Pro	4G	Active/Being deployed	Mainly used in rural areas/rural coverage. Also used to provide Dual or Tri-band LTE Advanced coverage within city limits.
850 MHz CLR	5	LTE/LTE-A/LTE-A Pro	4G	Active/Being deployed	Used for extra bandwidth within cities and rural coverage. Re-farmed from Decommissioning CDMA network across the country. Also re-farmed from 850 MHz UMTS network in some areas.
1.7/2.1 GHz AWS	4/66	LTE/LTE-A/LTE-A Pro	4G	Active/Being deployed	Main LTE Band used across the country. Also being used to provide LTE Advanced coverage.
1.9 GHz PCS	2	LTE/LTE-A/LTE-A Pro	4G	Active/Being deployed	Secondary LTE Band being deployed and used for LTE/LTE Advanced coverage. Re-farmed from Decommissioning CDMA network. Also re-farmed from 1,900 MHz UMTS network in some areas.
2.6 GHz IMT-E	7	LTE/LTE-A/LTE-A Pro	4G	Active/Being deployed	Found in select markets, but being developed slowly in new markets alongside to provide LTE Advanced coverage.
5.2 GHz U-NII	46	LTE/LTE-A/LTE-A Pro	4G	Active/Being deployed	License assisted access (LAA). Additional capacity in select cities.
600 MHz DD	n71	NR	5G	Active/Being deployed	NSA (Non-Standalone) Mode; Being actively deployed in several markets alongside n78. Spectrum owned by Telus, but can also be used by Bell customers via the RAN sharing agreement.
850 MHz CLR	n5	NR	5G	Active/Being deployed	NSA (Non-Standalone) Mode; Being actively deployed in several markets alongside n78.
1.9 GHz PCS	n25	NR	5G	Active/Being deployed	NSA (Non-Standalone) Mode; Secondary NR band
1.7/2.1 GHz AWS-3	n66	NR	5G	Active/Being deployed	NSA (Non-Standalone) Mode; Secondary NR band.
3.7 GHz C-Band	n77/n78	NR	5G	Active/Being deployed	NSA (Non-Standalone) Mode; Spectrum acquired in 2021 auction. Active since June 2022.

== Products ==
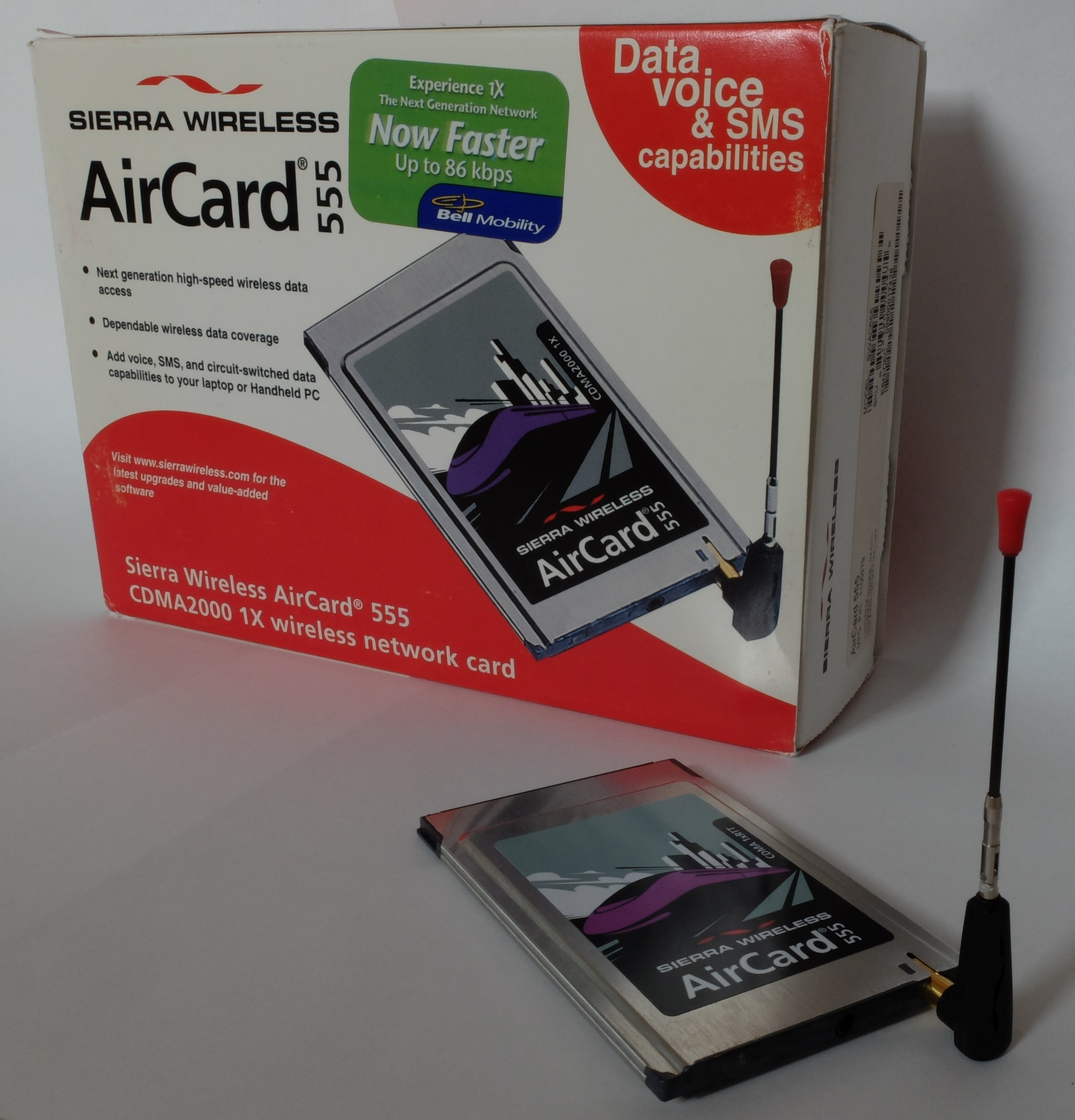
Sierra Wireless AirCard 555 CDMA modem from Bell

Bell Mobility currently carries iPhone and Android smartphones, plus the TCL Flip feature phone. These types of smartphones were added to Bell's lineup on November 4, 2009, coinciding with the carrier's launch of its 3G HSPA network. Since the launch of its 5G NR network in 2020, all devices sold by Bell are compatible with its 4G LTE network, and most smartphones are also compatible with its 5G network.

Former devices sold by Bell generally used deprecated network technologies: 3G CDMA and HSPA/HSPA+, 2G CDMA and 1G AMPS. Of these, only the HSPA and HSPA+ networks remain in operation, although they are scheduled to be shut down by December 31, 2025. In contrast to Verizon and Sprint in the United States, Bell did not offer CDMA service with its iPhone and Android devices. Bell formerly carried devices with the BlackBerry, webOS and Windows operating systems, which are no longer supported.

== Services ==
=== History ===
The first cell phone conversation in Canada took place on the Bell network between Jean Drapeau and Art Eggleton, the mayors of Montreal and Toronto, on July 1, 1985.

The first cell phone customer in Canada was Victor Surerus, a travelling funeral director out of Peterborough, Ontario who purchased a $2,700 CAD telephone set and took out a service subscription with Bell Canada in July 1985.

Bell Mobility discontinued its Advanced Mobile Phone System (AMPS) analog mobile network in February 2008.

=== Current services ===
- Telephony
- SMS and MMS

Bell offers a service to check account balances, minutes and megabytes of mobile data used, add features and answers to frequently asked questions. The service is called TCARE, short for text message care. It is used by sending a blank message to the phone number TCARE (82273).

=== Mobile Internet ===
Bell offers four Internet-only plans and several smartphone plans and add-ons for customers wishing to access mobile broadband.

Various fixed data allowances are offered by Bell: 10, 20, 100, 300 and 500 MB, as well as 1 to 6 GB, 10 GB and 15 GB. The 20 MB add-on is a daily allowance, while the others are monthly allowances.

Flexible data plans are also available. This is used for Bell Mobility's Internet-only plans and some smartphone plans, which begins with a certain usage limit at a lower tier. if this is exceeded, the customer moves to the next higher tier with a slightly larger allowance.

The flexible "Turbo Hub flex plan" from Bell differs in that customers have to pay a premium if they want to increase the maximum theoretical speeds from 7.2 Mbit/s to 21 Mbit/s. No additional usage is included when paying for the speed upgrade. Bell's policy is to only allow the sale of Turbo Hub service with its own Turbo Hub devices.

Monthly tier	Monthly bandwidth limits	Turbo Hub	Speeds		Over Usage Multiplier
Monthly tier	Monthly bandwidth limits	Turbo Hub	Download	Upload	Over Usage Multiplier
First	2 GB	Ericsson W35 (discontinued), NetGear MBR1210 (4G), NetGear MVBR1210C (4G + Voice), NetGear MBR1516 (LTE)	7.2 Mbit/s (some 21 Mbit/s)	5.76 Mbit/s	7 times # of extra GB
Second	5 GB	Ericsson W35 (discontinued), NetGear MBR1210 (4G), NetGear MVBR1210C (4G + Voice), NetGear MBR1516 (LTE)	7.2 Mbit/s (some 21 Mbit/s)	5.76 Mbit/s	4 times # of extra GB
Third	10 GB	Ericsson W35 (discontinued), NetGear MBR1210 (4G), NetGear MVBR1210C (4G + Voice), NetGear MBR1516 (LTE)	7.2 Mbit/s (some 21 Mbit/s)	5.76 Mbit/s	4 times # of extra GB
Fourth	15 GB	Ericsson W35 (discontinued), NetGear MBR1210 (4G), NetGear MVBR1210C (4G + Voice), NetGear MBR1516 (LTE)	7.2 Mbit/s (some 21 Mbit/s)	5.76 Mbit/s	10 times # of extra GB

- Bell's wireless Internet plan starts at the initial 2 GB tier. If this is exceeded, the tier automatically goes up to 5 GB, then up to 10 GB, then up to 15 GB as the final tier. There are additional charges if one does goes above the 15 GB tier.

Some grandfathered customers have an unlimited mobile Internet plan or add-on. These are usually limited to older and slower CDMA devices such as the now-discontinued Palm Pre, and normally cannot be used for tethering unless the device is a mobile broadband modem. Its active Virgin Mobile Canada brand also have grandfathered accounts with unlimited mobile broadband.

=== Mobile TV and Radio ===
Bell Mobile TV was launched for Bell smartphones on October 18, 2010.

=== Push-To-Talk ===
On April 24, 2012, Bell launched an improved Push-To-Talk (PTT) service. It is powered by Bell's newer HSPA+ network, in contrast to the operator's older PTT (Officially titled 10-4) service which used the CDMA network. HSPA+ service is available at one flat rate for unlimited Bell-to-Bell PTT service from and to Canada. The monthly service can either be purchased alone, or added to any plan at a lower cost. PTT roaming in the United States or other countries is billed per megabyte. One megabyte offers approximately ten minutes of PTT talk time. Consequently, Bell offers approximately 100 to 400 PTT roaming minutes for traveling in the USA.

=== Solo Mobile ===
Solo Mobile
- Type: Subsidiary
- Industry: Mobile virtual network operator
- Founded: 2000 (as Solo Prepaid); 2005 (as Solo Mobile)
- Fate: Only existing customers grandfathered; unsold stock transferred to Bell Mobility and Virgin Plus
- Headquarters: Canada
- Key people: Walter Van De Vijver, CEO
- Products: Feature phones and smartphones
- Services: Postpaid cellular service
- Parent: Bell Canada
- Website: solomobile.ca

Solo Mobile is a discontinued mobile virtual network operator in Canada, launched in 2000 by Bell Mobility as Solo Prepaid. Its products and services were positioned as a low cost brand. Solo was initially only sold in Ontario and Quebec, and included monthly plans for a 1¢/minute rate on nights and weekends. The brand later expanded to British Columbia and Alberta. In 2003, the company targeted Fido prepaid customers with a trade-in promotion, as well as students with a "Lunchtime & After School" prepaid plan. The brand was temporarily withdrawn from the market after the launch of Bell Mobility prepaid services. The SoloMobile.ca domain name was registered by Bell on December 17, 2004, with the Canadian Internet Registration Authority.

On August 1, 2005, the service relaunched as Solo Mobile, and was also available as a postpaid service. The service was initially limited to the Sanyo 2300 flip phone, available in four colours. That same month, the free Solo Mobile / Eckored concert tour featuring Keshia Chanté was organized to promote the brand. In 2008, Solo offered per-second billing to postpaid customers, a feature that originated with competitor Fido and also available with Koodo Mobile at the time. Solo's monthly plans became nearly identical to those offered by Koodo Mobile. On May 7, 2009, Bell Canada fully acquired Virgin Mobile Canada, which was rebranded to Virgin Plus in 2021. With this acquisition, the Solo Mobile brand became a lower priority. Solo offered four new features phones in its lineup in 2009, and five more in 2010. The LG Flick is Solo Mobile's first HSPA+ device. In 2011, Solo offered the Samsung Galaxy Gio Android smartphone and the Samsung Gravity 3 feature phone. The carrier previously offered BlackBerry smartphones, but not the iPhone. By the end of the year, the LG 230 was the only CDMA device still sold by Solo.

On May 17, 2012, new Solo Mobile activations were officially discontinued. The service remains limited to Bell's HSPA+ network, as Solo customers cannot access 4G LTE or 5G NR service. On July 31, 2017, Solo discontinued its prepaid services, and existing customers were migrated to Bell Mobility prepaid service. New prepaid activations were later discontinued at Virgin Plus on September 30, 2024, and at Bell Mobility on December 31, 2024. Since these changes, Bell is promoting Lucky Mobile as its prepaid brand.

=== Discontinued services ===
Bell launched a proprietary Video Calling service on November 4, 2009 for select HSPA+ mobile phones. The service featured a cost of $5 CAD per month for unlimited video calls. It was supported by the LG Xenon, Nokia C6, Nokia N97, Samsung Galaxy S Vibrant, Samsung Omnia II and Samsung Wave smartphones. These devices have all been discontinued. It is unknown whether or not a non-Bell Galaxy S, or even Bell's Samsung Galaxy S II, support the Video Calling service. These Android-based devices, however, can use the included Google Talk for videoconferencing as long as they have an Internet connection available.

BlackBerry Internet Service is no longer available.

== Advertising ==
In conjunction with the 2006 Olympics, Bell Mobility introduced a pair of anthropomorphic CGI beavers named Frank (voiced by Norm Macdonald) and Gordon (voiced by Ken Hudson Campbell), who constantly got into misadventures which led to Frank getting flustered with the antics of the dimwitted Gordon. Analysts covering a potential restructuring of BCE suggested getting rid of the Frank and Gordon ad campaign. They have also criticized some of Bell Mobility's initiatives as failing to tap the market, such as offering full-length movies.

The ad campaign was canceled by Bell on August 1, 2008 and replaced with the "Today just got better" campaign.

== Criticism ==
=== Feature restrictions ===
Some clients of Bell Mobility have claimed that their phones' features have been restricted. This action is typically referred to as "crippling". Examples of claims of restricted features are the inability to perform Bluetooth file transfers, for example with the OBEX profile or with a USB cable. Restrictions also include increasing the GPS lock time (2–10 minutes) and resolution (1-2.5 km) of third-party applications while maintaining the speed (10-15 s) and accuracy (10–25 m) of the branded GPS Nav program. GPS Nav service costs $10/month or $3.50/day in addition to the cost of a data plan. The phones affected include the BlackBerry 8830 World Edition, BlackBerry 8130 Pearl, and BlackBerry 8330 Curve.

Some clients claim that Bell Mobility purposely restricts these features in order to force them to use the data services and as a result pay more usage charges. Methods around these restrictions are to use an external memory card or software such as BitPim. Researching the abilities and lack thereof is recommended before purchasing a phone or PDA device, as some desired features may be lacking in the initial choice.

Some clients claim that Bell Mobility withholds firmware upgrades, especially for devices that are not meeting sales expectations. While some SKUs do receive updates on a regular basis, Bell Mobility is reluctant to release upgrades that add enhancements to product, focusing only on firmware releases that fix issues. Oftentimes those upgrades fail to become available as well.

=== Data Plans ===
In December 2007 the BBC reported a customer with a $7/month unlimited mobile browser plan received a $85,000 bill. The customer had used his phone as a wireless modem for his computer, and so data transferred was not included under the customer's unlimited mobile browser plan. Bell Mobility now releases in detail acceptable data usage in the terms of service. The BBC reported "Canadians complain that their mobile phone charges are much higher for comparable service in the United States".

=== Text Messaging ===
In July 2008, along with Telus Mobility Bell introduced charges of 15¢ for incoming SMS messages. Critics were quick to point out that there is no way of blocking incoming message fees and suggested Bell and Telus were price fixing as both had announced the fees simultaneously. Bell (and Telus) are now being sued by frustrated consumers and subscribers, as they demand change in text charges. Many customers were frustrated because this fee also apply to existing customers with ongoing contracts.

== Retail presence ==
In addition to running its own retail operations, Bell co-owns Glentel alongside their chief telecom and media rival, Rogers. Bell Mobility also distributes through the independent Cellcom Communications, mainly in the Greater Montreal area. Bell purchased ownership in The Source (formerly known as RadioShack) to increase its retail presence.

== See also ==
- Bell Canada, the parent of Bell Mobility
- List of Canadian mobile phone companies
- Bell Business Mobility Services
