= Chatr =

Canadian mobile virtual network operator

chatr Mobile
- Formerly: Chatr Wireless
- Type: Division
- Industry: Mobile network operator
- Founded: July 28, 2010; 16 years ago
- Headquarters: Toronto, Ontario, Canada
- Key people: Shailendra Gujarati (VP)
- Products: Android smartphone and feature phones
- Services: GSM, HSPA (including HSPA+), mobile broadband, SMS, telephony
- Parent: Rogers Communications
- Website: www.chatrwireless.com

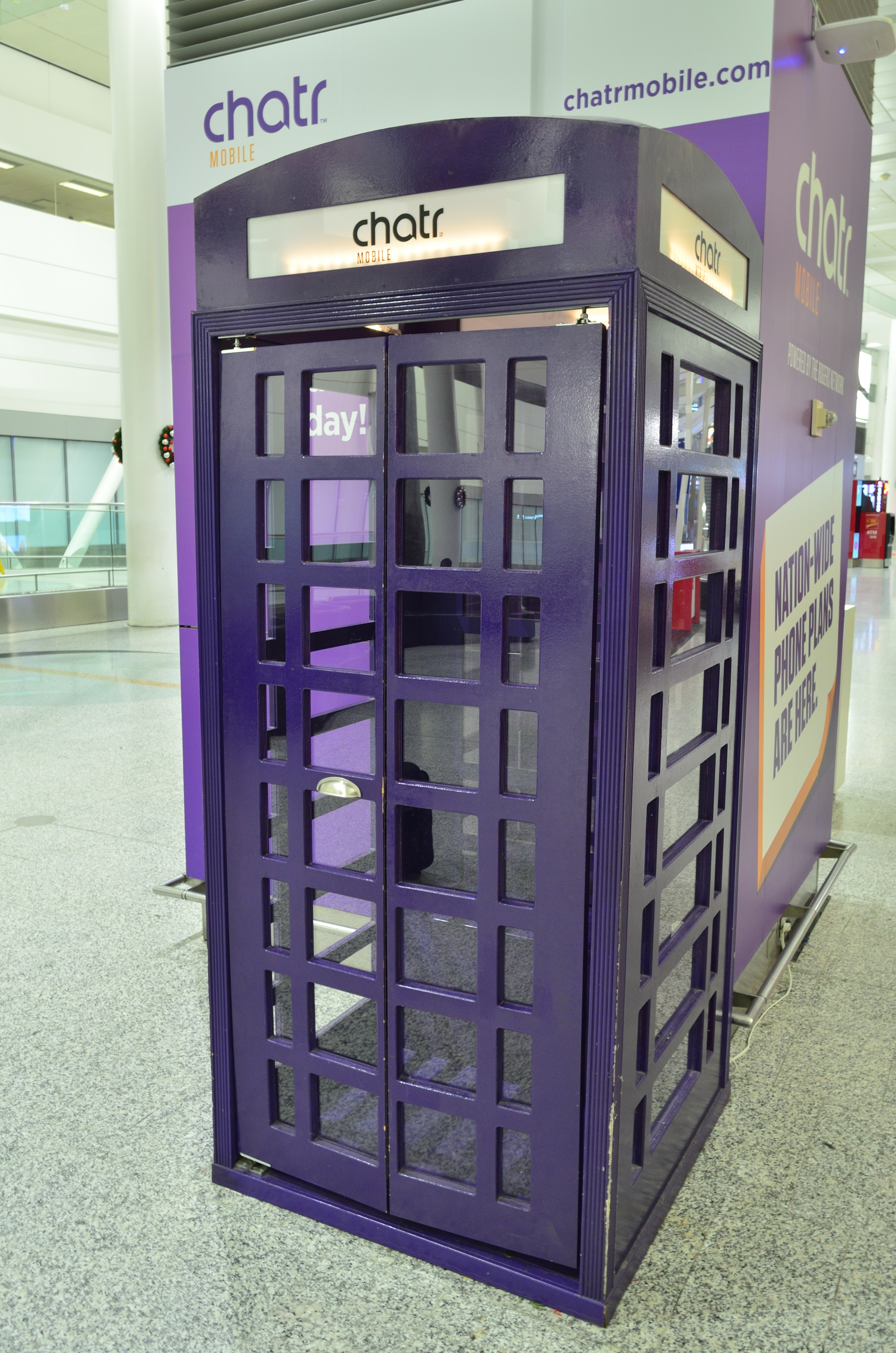
Chatr at Toronto Pearson Airport

Chatr Mobile (stylized as chatr) is a Canadian mobile virtual network operator owned by Rogers Communications targeting entry-level customers. It is one of three wireless brands owned by Rogers Communications, including Rogers Wireless, and Fido Solutions. The provider launched its service in Toronto, Ottawa, Calgary, Edmonton, Vancouver, Quebec City, and Montreal under the name Chatr Wireless on July 28, 2010. The company re-branded to its current name in 2015.

The carrier initially launched by limiting plan features to only specific regions of Rogers' network, dubbed "chatr zones". The company now offers coverage for most urban areas of Canada, and additional plans for certain cities.

== Network ==
The Chatr network includes coverage comparable to other major Canadian wireless carriers. It previously had "local talk zones", whereby calls not made in-zone were billed as roaming calls. It now offers Canada-wide calls from anywhere. Only the carrier's least expensive subscription plan lacks unlimited Canada-wide Talk as a feature.

As of 10 March 2020, new customers activating a Chatr line on a Nation-Wide Plan are provisioned to the LTE network. Existing Chatr customers were also migrated over to the LTE network.

=== 2022 outage ===
In July 2022, as part of the Rogers Communications outage, many Chatr customers experienced issues with (and in some cases complete cessation of) their mobile services. The issue was eventually resolved on July 8, and compensation was promised to customers.

== Services ==
=== Price plans ===
Chatr offers plans ranging from $15 to $70, most of which include unlimited Canada-wide calling and international SMS texting. Included mobile data ranges from 0.5 GB to 20.0 GB per month (depending on plan) at 3G speeds; once data allowance has been exhausted, subscribers may continue using data at no extra charge (albeit at much reduced speed) or may optionally purchase more data until their next anniversary date.

Sometime after February 2018, chatr's regular plans briefly offered a $10/month plan (50 minutes/50 texts) from August 2018 until March 2019 which was discontinued by June 2019, after which the cheapest plan was instead $15 for 100 minutes / unlimited texts.

=== Account and SIM expiration ===
Announced 22 May 2019, on 22 June 2019 was a scheduled changed to the terms of service so that inactive accounts (and their sim cards) would expire after 30 days inactivity instead of the previous policy of allowing 180 days inactivity before pruning them. Money on the account less than the amount required to buy a new month of service would be lost, whereas previously the account would not be closed unless $0 remained on it.

=== Common features ===
All Chatr plans include unlimited incoming texts, voicemail, call display, call waiting, call forwarding and group calling features. Features specific to each plan are listed below:

- The base plan: $15/month "100 minutes of Outgoing Talk and Unlimited Text" plan includes 100 minutes of outgoing calls and unlimited incoming calls, as well as unlimited incoming and outgoing SMS to Canada, the United States, and internationally.
- The Data and Unlimited Texting Plan: $25/month includes unlimited incoming calls, unlimited incoming and outgoing SMS to Canada, the United States, and internationally with 500MB of data.
- The Unlimited Talk and Text with Data Plans: $35/month "Unlimited Canada-wide Talk & International Text + 2.5GB of Data", $40/month "Unlimited Canada-wide Talk & International Text + 5GB of Data", $50/ Month "Unlimited Canada/US Talk & International Text + 10GB of Data"
- Signing up for pre-authorized payments gives you an additional 2GB on $25-$70 Plans and 250MB on $15 plans.

=== Services not included in some plans ===
Extra charges for additional features in each Chatr plan are as follows:

- A 40¢ per minute voicemail retrieval charge is charged on the $15 plan, which is waived on other all higher plans.
- US calls cost 40¢ per minute on all except the $55 and $70 plan.
- Data Plus can be added to the $25, $35, $40, $50, $55 plans, in denominations of 2GB for $10 when you run out of data to a maximum of 5 times

== Products ==
=== Phones ===
When Chatr was launched, it initially only sold feature phones. It began introducing smartphones in conjunction with its launch of mobile data in 2011, although feature phones continue to make up a significant portion of the company's phone offerings. Additionally, Chatr SIM cards allow other GSM-based handsets to be used.

Currently available devices are made by Nubia, Motorola, and Alcatel. In 2018, Chatr also added devices from Samsung to its line up along with one device from Huawei. Chatr formerly gave each phone a nickname (for example, "The Performer" or "The Steal") until its rebranding in 2015.

=== SIM cards ===
SIM cards from Chatr (available in Mini, Micro, and Nano sizes) are compatible with any GSM or HSPA+ device, such as those designed to be used with Rogers Wireless. This includes devices from Rogers itself, plus its mobile virtual network operators such as Fido and 7-Eleven Speak Out Wireless. Around June 2017, many retailers stopped advertising Chatr's $10 SIM card, and began offering it for sale online at Chatr's SIM card page.

== Controversy ==
Several controversies regarding Chatr received mainstream media coverage. The company received two accusations of breaching the Competition Act in Canada.

=== Fighter brand ===
Chatr has been accused of violating the Competition Act because it is a fighter brand created by Rogers. Some years ago Chatr's pricing policy closely reflected that of Wind Mobile. Mobilicity's former chairman, John Bitove, said that "[Rogers is] leveraging the other parts of their business to kill the competition […] If they succeed in killing us off there's no question they'd kill the Chatr brand off". Mobilicity was later purchased by Rogers and incorporated into Chatr.

=== Advertising claims ===
Shortly after its launch, Chatr published many advertisements claiming that their network has "fewer dropped calls than new wireless carriers." Following a complaint by wireless carriers Wind Mobile and Mobilicity, the Federal Competition Bureau has asked the Ontario Superior Court of Justice under the Misleading Advertising Provisions of the Competition Act to order Rogers to:

1. Stop Chatr's advertising campaign
2. Pay a 10-million dollar penalty
3. Pay restitution to any customers affected by the misleading claim
4. Send out a corrective notice to inform the public about the issue

The Bureau has accused Rogers of:

1. using misleading advertising to promote its talk-and-text service Chatr..."
2. having "...no evidence support[ing] Chatr's claim that their customers will experience fewer dropped calls than they would with new rival wireless carriers..."
3. directly breaching Section 78 of Misleading Advertising Provisions relating to "False or Misleading Representations and Deceptive Marketing Practices"

According to the court documents from the preceding, the bureau found that, on average, there is no significant difference between the number of dropped calls on Chatr and new carriers. Furthermore, in the cases of Ottawa and Toronto, new carriers experienced slightly fewer dropped calls than did Chatr.

- July 9, 2010: Mobilicity made several claims against Rogers revolving around the upcoming launch of Chatr. "If Rogers launches Chatr in the manner that's been speculated, it's clear that the Competition Act will be violated," John Bitove told reporters from his Toronto office.
- November 19, 2010: The Competition Bureau of Canada is seeking a $10-million penalty, the highest possible penalty from the country's largest wireless player after a two-month investigation into claims that Rogers had been making since late July.
- August 19, 2013: The Court dismissed the misleading advertising portion of the case against Rogers.
- February 21, 2014: Court orders $500,000 administrative monetary penalty in Rogers-Chatr matter.

=== Advertising ===
In 2010, Chatr Wireless' slogan was "No worries, talk happy." During the Christmas and holiday season, the slogan used instead was "No worries, gift happy." Both resemble the name of the song Don't Worry, Be Happy, and a whistled version of this song was used in Chatr commercials. The slogan is now "Now, you make the call".

In 2017, Chatr was awarded two silver CASSIES advertising awards, in the categories of Brand Reawakening and Targeting.

== Retail presence ==
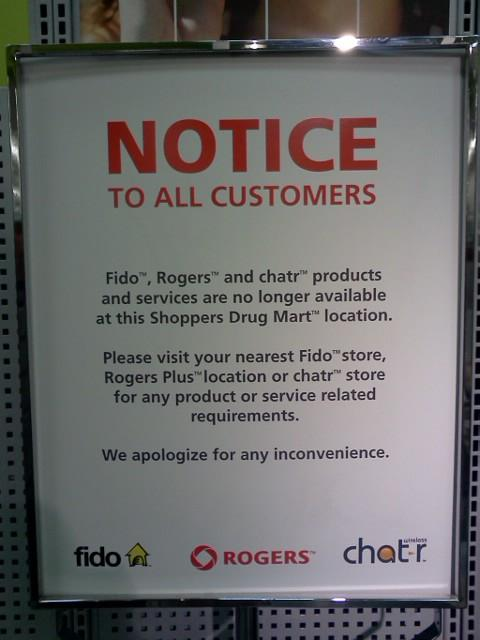
A sign of Rogers, Fido and Chatr at Shoppers Drug Mart

Best Buy, Costco, London Drugs, Tbooth, Walmart, WirelessWave, and Wireless Etc. sell Chatr prepaid products and top-up cards, as well as inexpensive SIM cards which allows any unlocked GSM phone with 850/1900 mHZ frequency to be activated on the Chatr network. Additionally, Chatr once ran its own self-branded retail stores, consisting of a network of kiosks from which customers could purchase phones, accessories, plans, top-ups, and more. Almost all of these have either closed or have been converted to WOW! mobile boutique stores, which provide services for several carriers, including Chatr. Earlier, all seven Chatr kiosks in Montreal were converted to Fido kiosks in May 2012. This did not affect the third-party retail presence of Chatr in Montreal. In Fall 2016, Chatr converted 54 Mobilicity stores and kiosks to Chatr-branded locations.

While Shoppers Drug Mart carried only Rogers Wireless prepaid phones at one time, the stores temporarily partnered with the network operator to carry both prepaid and postpaid products and services for Rogers and its two other brands, Fido and Chatr. There was an in-store display, showcasing many of the phones available. As of March 2011, however, Shoppers stores ended their partnership. They only sell prepaid top-up vouchers for these providers.

== See also ==
- List of Canadian mobile phone companies

=== Other brands owned by Rogers ===
- Rogers Wireless
- Fido Solutions
- Cityfone - As of November 15, 2023 the company stopped accepting new activations and began transitioning customers over to Rogers Wireless.
- Mobilicity - now defunct, merged with Chatr in 2016.
