= Virgin Plus =

Canadian telecommunication company

- Formerly: Virgin Mobile Canada (2005–2021)
- Type: Division
- Industry: Mobile virtual network operator
- Founded: March 1, 2005; 21 years ago
- Headquarters: Toronto, Ontario, Canada
- Area served: Canada
- Key people: Floyd Rocha (MD)
- Products: Smartphones; Wireless Plans; Home Broadband Internet; Member Benefits Program
- Parent: Bell Canada
- Website: virginplus.ca

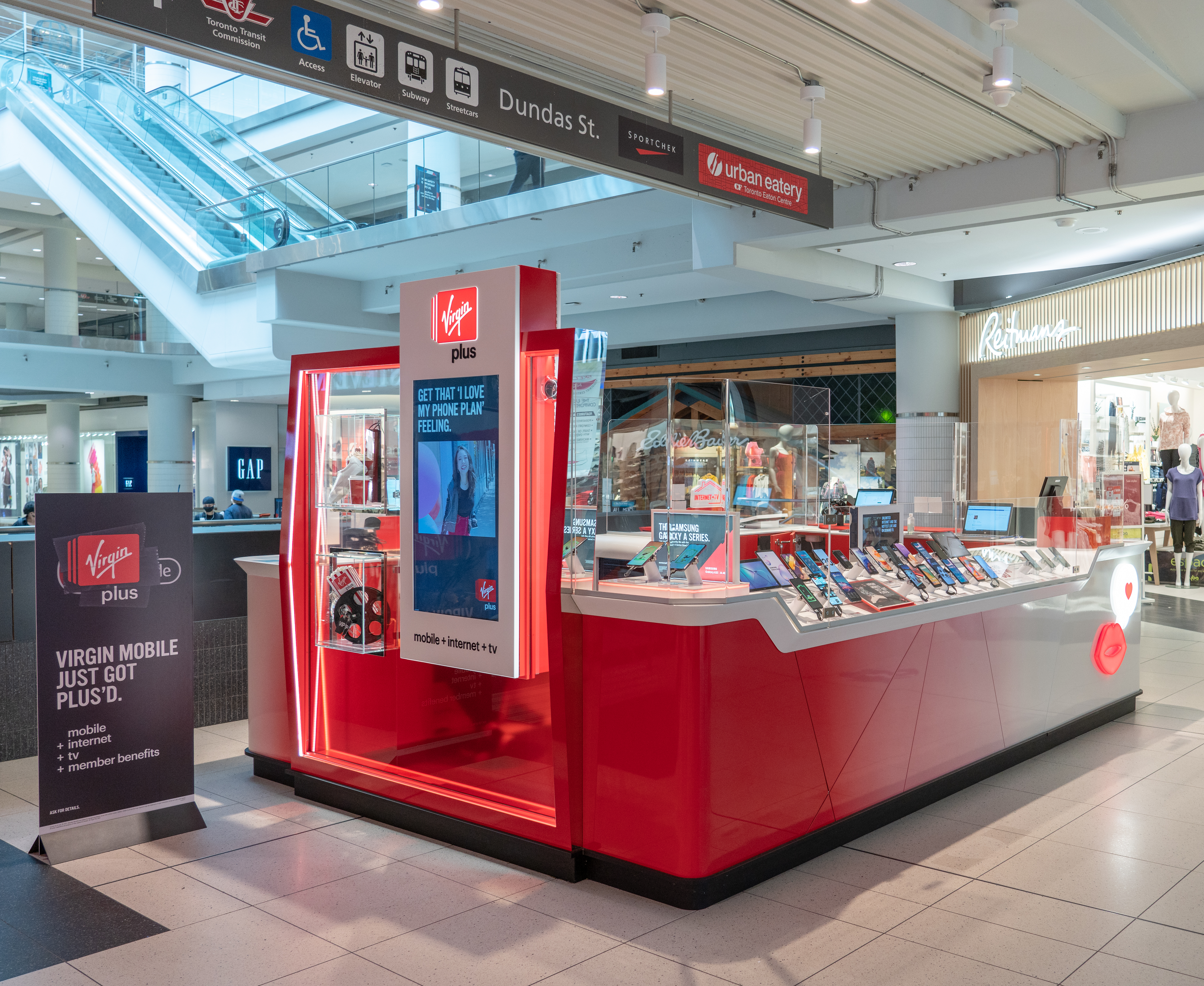
Virgin Plus kiosk at Toronto Eaton Centre

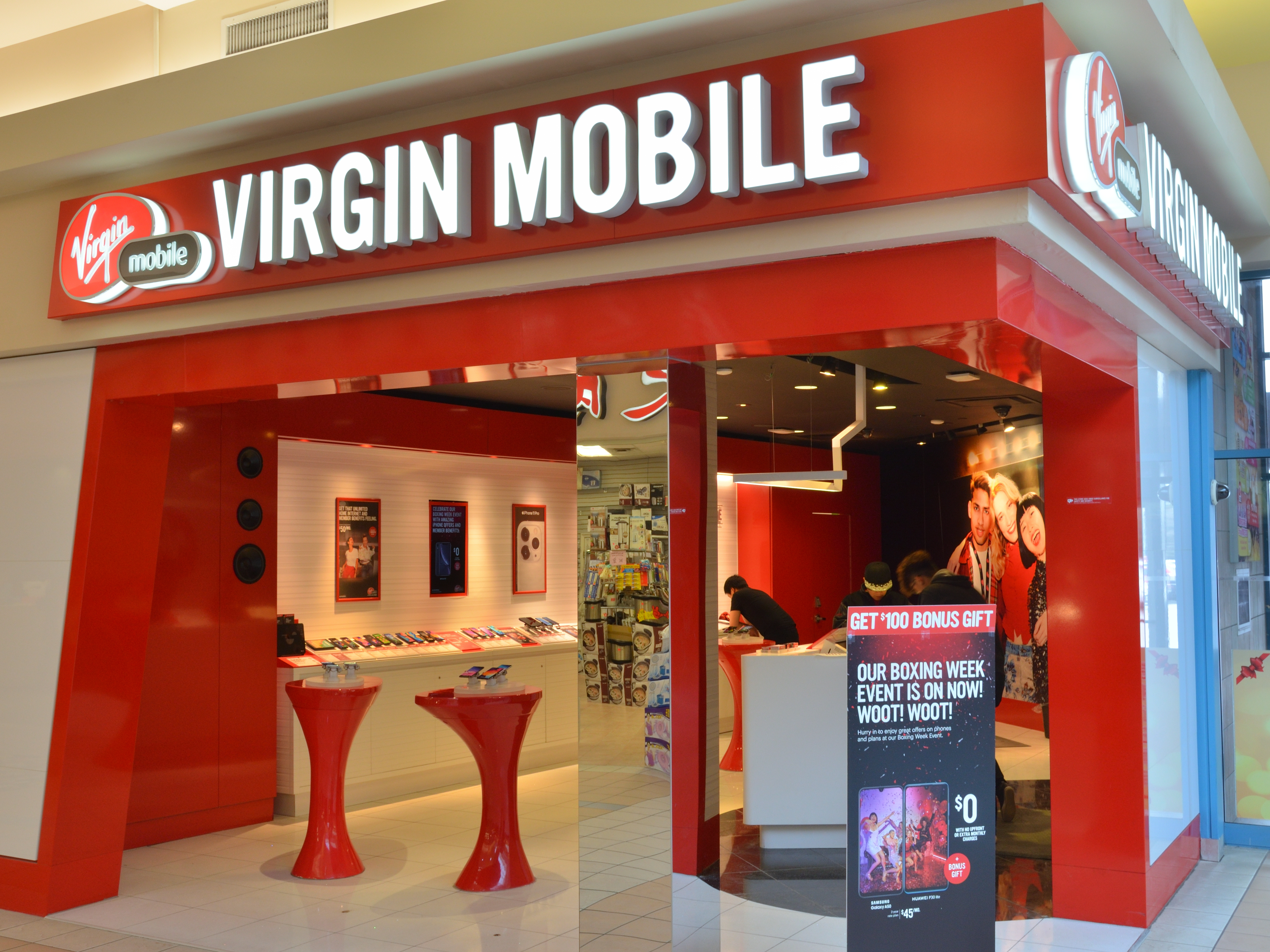
Virgin Mobile at First Markham Place

Virgin Plus is a Canadian provider of postpaid wireless voice, text and data communications services throughout Canada. They also offer home Internet and TV services in select areas of Ontario and Quebec. Launched as Virgin Mobile Canada on March 1, 2005, as a joint venture between Virgin Group and BCE Inc., BCE took sole ownership on July 1, 2009, when it closed a deal to purchase the stake it did not already own. Virgin Plus calls its customers 'Members' and offers a Member Benefits program, which provides its customers with special offers, discounts, and VIP experiences.

== History ==
=== 2003–2004: Pre-launch ===
The VirginMobile.ca domain name was registered by Virgin Enterprises Limited on July 4, 2003, with the Canadian Internet Registration Authority. When accessed, it displayed a domain parking page until June 14, 2004, when it was replaced with an announcement. There were also links to information about the company, related news articles, and career opportunities. Virgin Mobile claimed: "we work like maniacs to bring you Canada’s most awesome mobile phone company."

=== 2005–2007: Launch ===
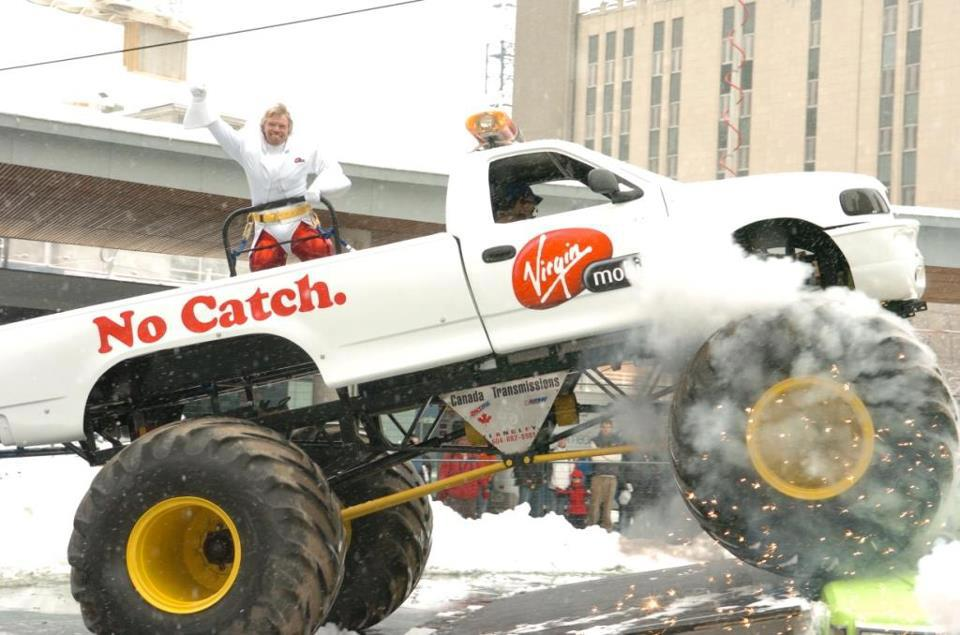
VMC launch stunt

Former Virgin Mobile Canada logo

Virgin Mobile launched in Canada on March 1, 2005, as a mobile virtual network operator (MVNO) using the Bell Mobility network. At the time, Virgin Mobile was operating solely as a prepaid service. The company's website showcased several feature phones it offered, and advertised itself as a "no catch" mobile operator. Virgin Mobile Canada was the first mobile carrier in Canada to launch without a system access fee. The company's “no catch” campaign at launch featured cheeky advertisements likening existing Canadian mobile carriers as “the catch”, and Virgin Mobile Canada as the cure to unclear contracts and undesirable hidden fees. Sir Richard Branson helped create excitement at launch by zip-lining from a high-rise building into Yonge-Dundas Square (now Sankofa Square) in a superhero costume, and drove a monster truck over three cars symbolizing “The Big Three” mobile carriers in Canada – Rogers, Telus, and Bell. Since its launch, Virgin Mobile has used edgy and controversial advertising, leading to demands for an apology, requests to cease and desist the advertising, and even boycotts. This marketing technique is still used by Virgin Mobile Canada to this day.

=== 2008: Postpaid services ===
In February 2008, Virgin Mobile Canada launched postpaid wireless service. To promote and encourage Canadians to consider the new postpaid service, the company released a new slogan, "It's Better to Be a Member". At launch, this was known as 'myPlan', and the company offered a multitude of options, including the ability to set one's own timeframe for unlimited calling, as opposed to the windows generally offered by competing mobile companies. Since then, postpaid plans have become a popular choice for new and existing Members, and plans continue to evolve in the highly competitive telecom market.

=== 2009–2010: Acquisition by Bell Mobility, brand re-positioning, HSPA+ and SuperTab ===
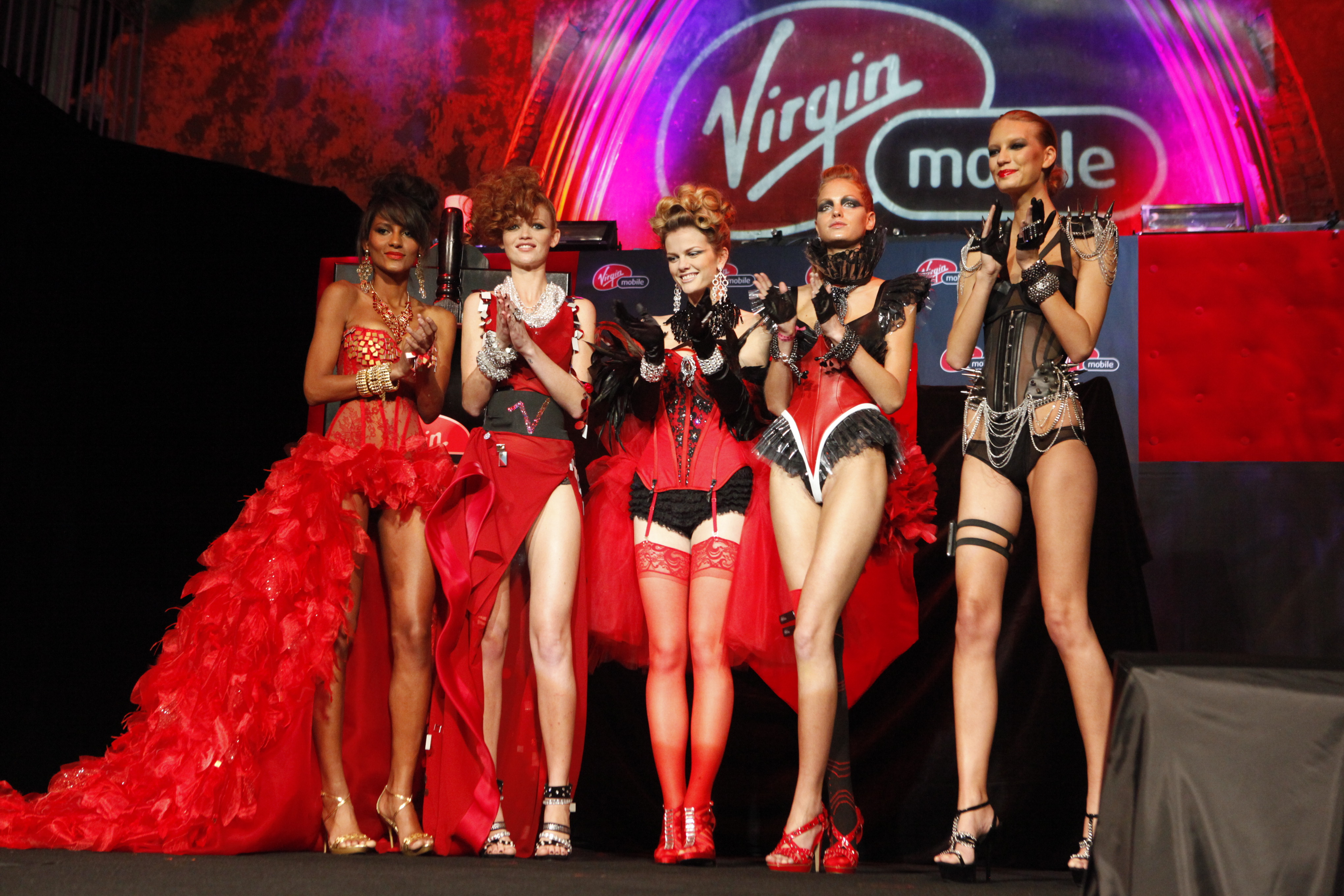
sim fashion show

On July 1, 2009, Bell Mobility acquired 50% of Virgin Mobile Canada that it previously did not own for $142 million and entered into a long-term agreement to use the Virgin brand. Following this, Bell greatly reduced its investments into Solo Mobile in order to invest in and improve its new Virgin brand. On December 21, 2009, Virgin Mobile Canada's then-president Robert Blumenthal promised "a very different Virgin Mobile" with "higher-value devices and services" in 2010.

Virgin Mobile officially launched HSPA+ services on February 2, 2010. This was promoted with a “SIM Fashion Show” launch event featuring Victoria's Secret models. The company launched HSPA+ with several phones, including the BlackBerry Bold 9700, BlackBerry Curve 8530, the iPhone 3G, iPhone 3GS, MiFi and Samsung M330. A Broadband2Go USB mobile broadband modem was also part of the launch lineup. To prepare for the back-to-school season of that year, the Virgin Mobile SuperTab was introduced on August 23 as a response to competition from other providers, especially Koodo Mobile. The SuperTab was only available to postpaid Members, while HSPA+ products and services were unavailable to prepaid Members until around spring in 2011.

=== 2010–2011: Member benefits launch, unlimited plans and Galaxy Nexus exclusivity ===
To differentiate itself from other mobile providers, Virgin Mobile Canada launched its Member Benefits program in 2010. This program is available to all Postpaid and Prepaid Members and provides exclusive discounts and VIP experiences with many well-known brands in the fashion, travel, music, and entertainment space. Since launch, the program has grown and offers exclusive offers for its Members.

In response to competition from major mobile brands and new entrants, Virgin Mobile introduced a City Unlimited plan on February 18, 2011. Later that year, in order to imitate Koodo Mobile's pricing, Virgin Mobile reduced Canadian long-distance charges, eventually eliminating them altogether. For the same reason, a plan with unlimited Canadian long-distance minutes was launched by Virgin, priced identically to Koodo's equivalent offering.

The carrier is notable for being one of Canada's two carriers to exclusively carry the Galaxy Nexus smartphone for the country's Christmas and holiday season of 2011. Bell Mobility, Virgin Mobile's parent, also has this exclusivity during that time period. The flagship device from the Google Nexus series is the first in the world to run the Android 4 operating system. On November 29, Virgin Mobile invited its Members to join the Galaxy Nexus Tester Team. Each Member in this team of five received a complimentary Galaxy Nexus, but they had to tweet about their experiences with the device. The smartphone was launched on December 8, and the five Tester Team members were chosen on the following day. Other Canadian carriers sold the Galaxy Nexus in 2012.

=== 2012: SIM-only promotion and LTE ===
On January 9, 2012, Virgin Mobile Canada launched a limited time promotion where postpaid customers who activated only a SIM card during that month would obtain an ongoing $5/month discount when they subscribed to any talk and text plan. Those with a smartphone plan would receive an ongoing $10/month discount instead. On January 25, 2013, Virgin Mobile Canada introduced "Bring Your Own Phone (BYOP)" which allows members to bring their own phone, get a Virgin Mobile SIM card, and receive 10% off their monthly rate every month on a 30 Day Term.

In conjunction with the launch of the third-generation iPad, Virgin Mobile Canada customers were able to access Bell Mobility's LTE network. Postpaid phones are available with LTE. The 4G LTE network provides peak speeds up to 75 Mbit/s, with expected average speeds of 12 – 25 Mbit/s. Outside 4G LTE coverage areas, customers fall back to the 3G HSPA+ network.

=== 2013–2020: Tiered plans, two-year agreements and Wireless Code of Conduct ===
On August 1, 2013, Virgin Mobile Canada discontinued its SuperTab proposition, and introduced a new Silver, Gold, and Platinum Plan proposition where all plans are only available on 30 Day (monthly) terms or 2 Year Agreements. This allows Members to choose a rate plan level to receive a higher or lower subsidy when they activate a new phone with Virgin Mobile. At launch, Silver Plans offered Members a $150 subsidy on their new phone, Gold Plans offered Members a $250 subsidy on their new phone, and Platinum offered a $500 subsidy on their new phone. Since then, the subsidy offering has evolved to offer Members up to $200 off the retail price of their phone on Silver Plans, up to $300 off the retail price of their phone with Gold Plans, and up to $700 off the retail price of their phone with Platinum Plans.

On November 6, 2013, Virgin Mobile became Wireless Code of Conduct compliant before the deadline given to all mobile carriers in Canada by the Canadian Radio-Television and Telecommunications Commission (CRTC).

=== 2021–present: Rebranding as Virgin Plus and ending prepaid support ===
On July 16, 2021, the company informed customers of an upcoming rebranding as Virgin Plus, effective July 19, 2021. In announcing the rebranding publicly, the company noted that it reflects the brand's expansion into home internet and TV service in some parts of Canada. On September 30, 2024, Virgin Plus announced the discontinuation of their prepaid services for new customers.

== Networks ==
Virgin Plus customers use Bell Mobility's LTE, HSPA+, and 5G networks.

== Phones ==
=== Featured manufacturers ===
Virgin Plus offers smartphones from the following manufacturers, available on the HSPA+ and LTE network. They can be activated on a postpaid plan:

- ZTE
- Apple
- Google
- Samsung
- HTC
- Motorola
- Alcatel
- LG
- Huawei

== Services ==
Various services are offered by Virgin Plus for postpaid customers.

Virgin Plus offers eSIM to their customers to connect and access their network. Customers with the eSIM compatible device will be able to utilize their eSIM product to get the services.

=== Voice ===
Until Q1 2013, Virgin Plus had two types of postpaid plans: Choice and Combo. The Choice category was low-end and only included talk and text, while Combo was high-end and added mobile Internet access. On January 25, 2013, Virgin Plus renamed Choice to Silver and Combo to Platinum. A third plan type, Gold, was also added on that day. This category is considered mid-range.

Virgin Plus changed its focus to postpaid plans since 2008. Virgin Plus still has a few minor distinctions which make some of its plans unique. For example, Virgin Plus's plans allowed Members to choose either the caller ID and voicemail calling features or the SMS and MMS messaging features. More recently, Canada-Wide minutes, Voicemail & Caller ID, Unlimited International Text Messaging, and Unlimited Picture and Text Messaging to Canada and the US are built into all postpaid plans.

=== Mobile internet ===
All talk and text plans automatically include pay-per-use data, a flexible mobile broadband add-on imitating Koodo's pricing for its "Data Saver" add-on. Initially branded as Commitment-Free Data, Virgin Plus was innovative in that it was the first to charge $0 for the add-on. Koodo customers, on the other hand, previously had to pay for their data add-on even if unused for a month. Currently, the Silver rate plan level includes a variety of plans both with either Pay Per use data or built-in data to appeal to different user lifestyles.

Those with a BlackBerry running OS 7.1 or lower, using Virgin Plus cannot obtain Pay Per Use Data. Instead, Virgin Plus offers unlimited BBM at no extra charge with certain monthly plans. Customers have the option to charge BlackBerry App World downloads or the BBM Music service directly on their Virgin Plus bill.

=== Virgin Plus TV ===
Virgin Plus TV (initially known as simply Virgin TV) is a television and Internet service bundle that launched on July 14, 2020. It is available in Ontario and Quebec as a white-label version of Bell Fibe TV's app-only product (previously known as Alt TV). Virgin TV service must be paired with an unlimited Virgin Plus home Internet package capable of 15 Mbit/s or higher bandwidth speeds. The service uses an Internet connection and does not function as a traditional television service. Virgin TV is accessed through an app, as opposed to a set-top box. In contrast to Bell Fibe, there are no quality of service guarantees as no bandwidth is dedicated for video which can use up to 850 MB per hour of bandwidth for standard quality. Some channels are available from anywhere in Canada, while the majority are only available when connected to the customer's home Internet connection.

=== Member benefits, events & sponsorship ===
Since 2010, Virgin Plus offers a "Member Benefits" loyalty program to Members. This allows Virgin Plus Members access exclusive contests, discounts, other one-of-a-kind opportunities. Categories originally included only four pillars: music, entertainment, fashion, travel. However, the program has evolved to include more partnerships that provide value for Members, but fall outside of these categories, such as food offers from Pizza Pizza, and New York Fries.

On February 2, 2011, the brand announced a partnership with Walt Disney Studios Motion Pictures. The following month, Virgin Mobile partnered with H&M. In June of that same year, Flight Centre began offering exclusive discounts to Virgin Mobile Members. Numerous other partners have been added over time, such as New York Fries, The Body Shop and Zipcar. Cineplex Entertainment, and Porter Airlines were added in May 2012, and while current Cineplex offers are only valid for new Cineplex Scene customers, the cinema chain announced future deals for existing customers as well. In 2013 & 2014, more new partners have come on board, including Banana Republic, Warner Bros. Entertainment, G Adventures, and Dynamite.

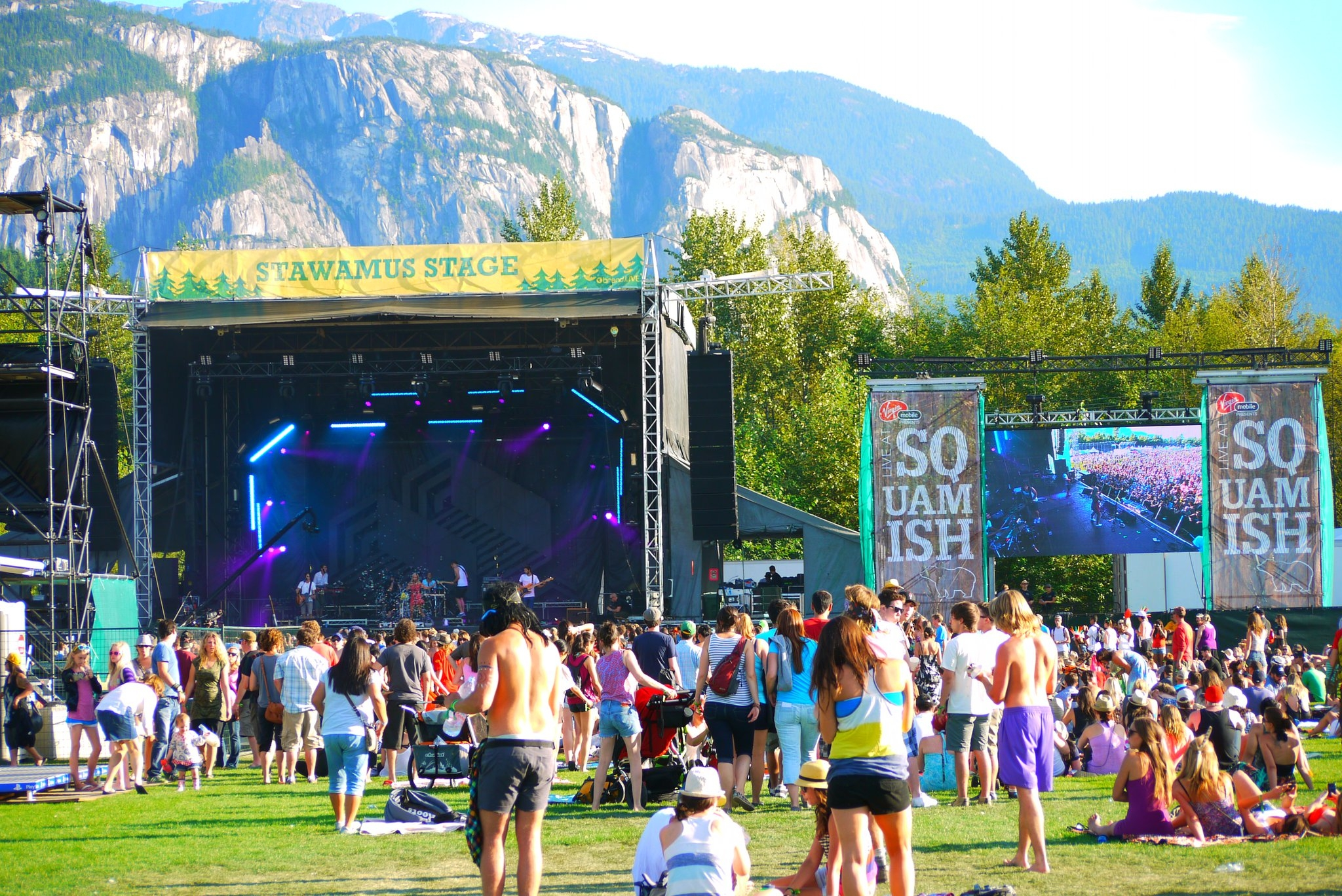
Virgin Mobile presents Squamish Valley Music Festival (2013)

Virgin Plus also sponsors several nationally recognized events & creates unique experiences and opportunities for Members. For example, Virgin Plus sponsors the Virgin Mobile presents Osheaga Musique Festival et Arts in Montreal, QC, Virgin Mobile Stampede Concert Series at the Calgary Stampede in Calgary, AB, and Virgin Mobile presents Squamish Valley Music Festival in Squamish Valley, BC. Virgin Plus offers Members the opportunity to enter contests on the Member Benefits webpage to win VIP experiences at these events.

Virgin Plus sponsors the music venue Virgin Mobile Corona Theatre in Montreal, and formerly sponsored Virgin Mobile Mod Club in Toronto.

=== Discontinued services ===
Virgin Plus prepaid services were discontinued for new customers on September 30, 2024, though existing customers can continue using their prepaid service until January 15, 2027. Bell Mobility, which operates Virgin Plus, recommends its Lucky Mobile brand for new prepaid activations. Prepaid service at Virgin Plus was the only type of service available upon the company's launch on March 1, 2005, when it was known as Virgin Mobile Canada. This service used the CDMA network and included a par-per-use plan, which charged per-minute billing for local calling or per-message fee for each SMS sent, and monthly plans, with features such as local calling minutes or unlimited messaging. All plans included unlimited received SMS, caller ID, voicemail, call waiting, call forwarding and conference calling, although regular airtime charges may apply. Add-ons could be purchased for additional features. In 2011, Virgin launched prepaid service for its HSPA+ network. The service was later expanded to its LTE network.

== Retail presence ==
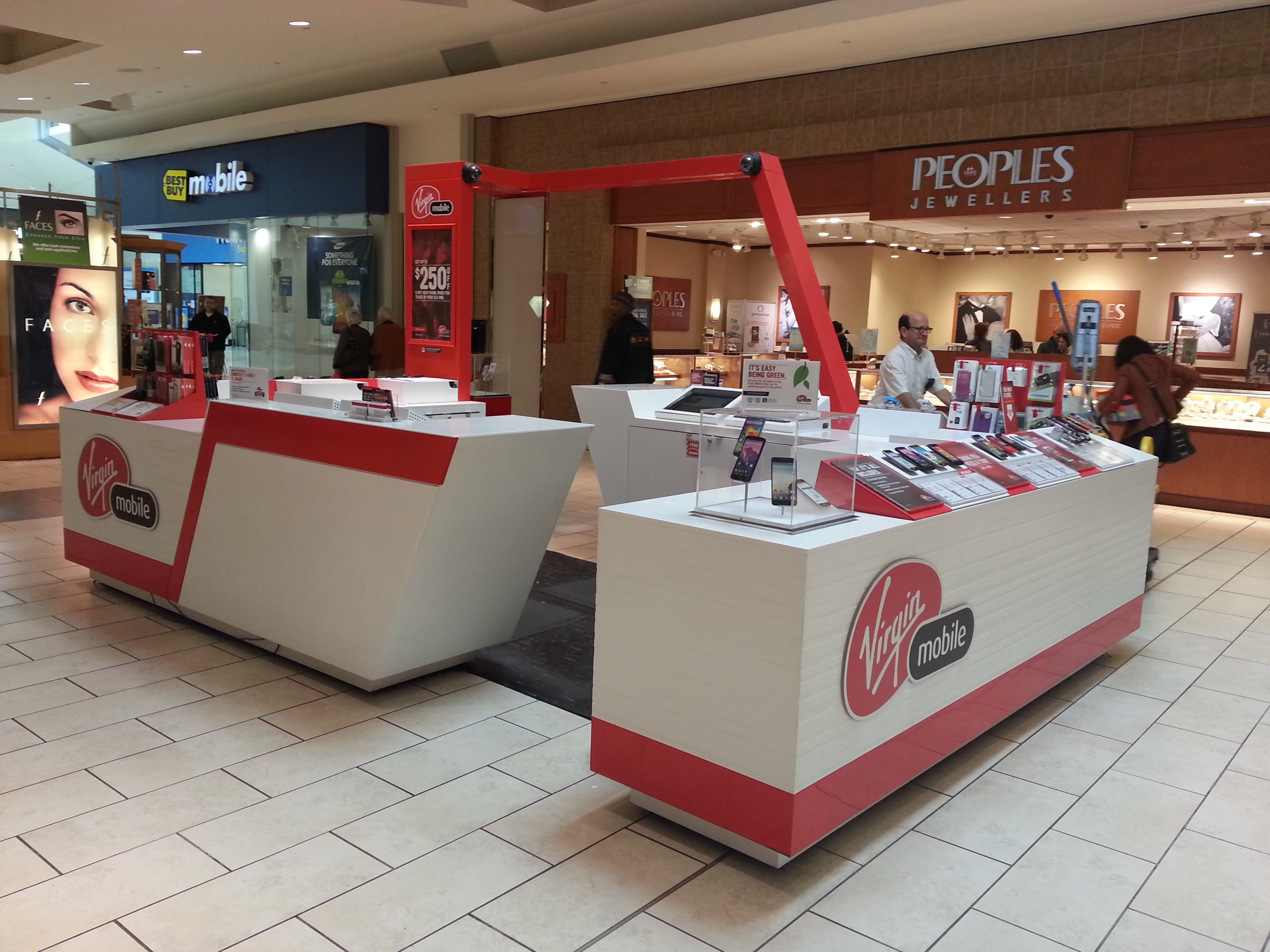
VM kiosk

Since its inception, Virgin Plus has its own dedicated retail kiosks. Such booths are usually located in the middle of a mall hall, but can sometimes be found in its own corner or built as a mini-store.

On June 10, 2011, Virgin Group chairman Richard Branson and Glee star Cory Monteith celebrated the opening of Virgin Mobile Canada's first street-front store, located in Montreal, Quebec. A few days later, on June 17, a second Virgin store was built inside the MuchMusic headquarters in Toronto, Ontario. This store is called "Virgin Mobile at Much". The third retail store was opened in Halifax, Nova Scotia.

Starting Q3 2012, select Virgin Mobile Canada retail locations became what are known as 'Service Lounges', A Service Lounge offers live, in person Warranty Support and can accept broken devices eligible for repair under the Virgin Mobile Standard Warranty Program in addition to issuing 'Loaner Devices'. In Q4 2012, Virgin Mobile Canada also started offering an extended warranty program called 'Virgin Smart Care' (VSC). As of October 2018, there are three tiers of VSC: Plus $6/month (mobile phones & select smartphones), Premium $9/month (mobile phones, select smartphones & tablets), Premium $12/month (premium select smartphones & tablets).

== See also ==
- Bell Mobility
- Virgin Mobile
- List of Canadian mobile phone companies
- List of internet service providers in Canada
