= List of Canadian telephone companies =

This is a list of telephone companies in Canada.

== Canadian telephone companies ==
Note: incumbent local exchange carriers are indicated with an asterisk (*).

- AstraQom
- BabyTEL
- Bell Canada - including Bell Aliant* (which itself integrated MT&T, NewTel, NBTel, and IslandTel), Bell MTS*, NorthernTel*, Northwestel*, Ontera*, and Télébec*
- Birch Communications
- Brooke Telecom Co-operative Ltd
- Bruce Telecom
- CityWest
- Cogeco
- Comwave
- Distributel
- DMTS
- Eastlink
- Execulink Telecom
- Gosfield North Communications Co-op
- Iristel, including its Ice Wireless affiliate
- LES.NET
- Lucky Mobile
- MNSi Telecom
- North Renfrew Telephone Company
- Novus
- Provincial Tel
- Public Mobile
- Rogers Communications, including Shaw Communications, Fido & the Chatr brand
- SaskTel*
- Signal Canada
- Sogetel
- Tbaytel*
- TekSavvy Solutions Inc.
- TELUS - made up of BCTel, AGT*
- Vidéotron - including Freedom Mobile, Fizz Mobile, and VMedia.

== See also ==
- Canadian Independent Telephone Association
- List of Canadian mobile phone companies
- List of Canadian electric utilities
- List of public utilities
- List of United States telephone companies
- List of telephone operating companies
