= List of mobile network operators in Canada =

As of October 2024, there are over 37.2 million wireless subscriptions in Canada. Approximately 90% of Canadian mobile phone users subscribe to one of the four largest national telecommunication companies (Rogers Wireless, Telus Mobility, Bell Mobility and Freedom Mobile) or one of their subsidiary brands. These four mobile network operators own and operate transmission facilities that cover most of the country, though they sometimes share each other's networks in certain geographical regions in order to reduce costs and reach more customers.

The remaining 10% of subscribers are served by smaller, regional providers, mobile virtual network operators (MVNOs), and resellers. Regional providers own and operate transmission facilities that cover a limited area and rely on partnerships with national service providers to connect their customers across Canada. In contrast, MVNOs and resellers do not own spectrum or network infrastructure and are required to lease network capacity from other providers at wholesale rates. While MVNOs have their own facilities to package and support their mobile services, resellers rely on the host network provider to package, market, bill, and deliver mobile services.

All wireless service providers in Canada are regulated by the Canadian Radio-television and Telecommunications Commission (CRTC), which has been blamed by some for the concentration of wireless service subscribers to only three large national carriers. Though measures have been taken to encourage more competition, critics suggest that more should be done to address the issue, e.g. by mandating wholesale network access for MVNOs.

== Mobile network operators (MNOs) ==
This is a list of mobile network operators, which includes national and regional service providers. Where applicable, this list will also include any subsidiary "extension" brands associated with a mobile service provider. While primary brands, such as Rogers Wireless or Bell Mobility, account for roughly 82% of wireless revenue, extension brands allow wireless service providers to differentiate service offerings and reach broader market segments.

| Operator | Subscriber total | Subscribers by service type | | Coverage (excluding roaming) | Ownership |
| Operator | Subscriber total | Postpaid | Prepaid | Coverage (excluding roaming) | Ownership |
|---|---|---|---|---|---|
| Bell Mobility: Virgin Plus; Lucky Mobile | 10.32 million (Q1 2026) | 9.56 million | 0.75 million | Nationwide | BCE Inc. |
| Eastlink Wireless | ? | ? | ? | NB, NL, NS, ON, PE, AB | Eastlink |
| Iristel: Ice Wireless | ? | ? | ? | NU, NT, YT, QC | Iristel |
| K-Net Mobile | ? | ? | ? | Ontario | Keewaytinook Okimakanak |
| Rogers Wireless: Fido Mobile; Chatr Mobile | 12.26 million (Q2 2026) | 11.04 million | 1.22 million | 10 Provinces only | Rogers Communications |
| SaskTel Mobility: Lüm Mobile | 0.692 million (Q2 2025) | ? | ? | Saskatchewan | Saskatchewan Government |
| Sogetel Mobilité | ? | ? | ? | Quebec | Sogetel |
| SSi Canada: Qiniq; EEYou Mobile | ? | ? | ? | Nunavut only for Qiniq, Quebec for EEYou Mobile | SSi Canada |
| TbayTel Mobility | ? | ? | ? | Ontario | Thunder Bay Municipal Government |
| Telus Mobility: Koodo Mobile; Public Mobile | 10.31 million (Q1 2026) | ? | ? | Nationwide | Telus Corporation |
| Vidéotron Mobility: Freedom Mobile; Fizz Mobile | 4.43 million (Q1 2026) | ? | ? | QC, ON, BC, AB, MB | Québecor |

== Mobile virtual network operators (MVNOs) and resellers ==
| Operator | Network | Ownership | Type / Info |
|---|---|---|---|
| 7-Eleven Speak Out Wireless | Rogers | Ztar Mobile | MVNO |
| Tigiidoo | Rogers / Bell | Tigiidoo | MVNO |
| DCI Wireless | Telus | DCI Telecom Inc. | Reseller |
| Fongo Wireless | Rogers | Fibernetics Corporation | Data only plans |
| PC Mobile: No Name Mobile | Bell | Loblaws | MVNO |
| Good2Go Mobility | Telus | Ztar Mobile | MVNO |
| Carry Telecom Mobile | Telus | Carry Telecom | MVNO |
| Wundle Mobile | Rogers / Bell | Wundle United Co-Op/Fabricate INC | MVNO |
| PhoneBox Canada: Eyesurf; CIK Telecom | Telus | Connex Telecommunications Inc. | MVNO |
| Canadiansim.com | Rogers | Canadiansim.com | Reseller |
| Execulink Mobility | Bell | Execulink Telecom Inc. | Reseller/Wiresless Carrier |
| Quadro Mobility | Bell | Quadro Communications Co-operative Inc. | Reseller/Wiresless Carrier |
| Wightman Mobility | Telus | Wightman Telecom Ltd. | Reseller/Wiresless Carrier |
| CTExcel Canada | Telus | China Telecom | MVNO |
| Cogeco Mobile | Telus | Cogeco | MVNO |
| Kini Mobile | Telus | Kin Innovation | MVNO |
| SimforCanada | Rogers | SimforCanada | Reseller eSIM Data Plans |

== Push-to-talk networks ==
| Operator | Ownership | Coverage | Technology | Frequency | Status | Notes |
|---|---|---|---|---|---|---|
| Airtel Wireless | Airtel Wireless Ltd. | Calgary | iDEN | SMR | Active | |
| Fleetcom | Fleetcom Inc. | Toronto | iDEN | SMR | Active | |

== Former MVNOs ==
| Operator | Network | Ownership | Notes |
|---|---|---|---|
| Amp'd Mobile | Telus Mobility | | Launched on March 14, 2007. Discontinued on August 1, 2007 and eventually replaced by Koodo. |
| Clearnet | Telus Mobility | | Started as second Clearnet incarnation as MVNO on April 5, 2011 by Telus. Discontinued as of June 2, 2012. |
| MiKE | Telus Mobility | | Launched in 1996 by Clearnet on iDEN platform from Motorola. Clearnet acquired by Telus in 2000. Shutdown on January 29, 2016. |
| Shaw Mobile | Freedom Mobile | Rogers Wireless | Discontinued as of December 21, 2023. |
| Solo Mobile | Bell Mobility | Bell Canada | Discontinued for new customers, but still active for current ones. |
| Sprint Canada | Fido | Rogers Wireless | Had 31,000 customers in Q3 2005 before being acquired |
| Petro-Canada Mobility | Rogers Wireless | Ztar Mobile | Discontinued, customers migrated to Good2Go Mobility |
| Xplore Mobile | Bell Mobility | Xplore Inc. | Xplore Mobile brand was announced August 1, 2018. Discontinued August 2022. |
| Cityfone | Rogers Wireless | | As of November, 15, 2023 the company stopped accepting new activations. All customers will be transitioned to Rogers Wireless by December 1, 2024 |
| Primus Wireless | Rogers Wireless | | As of November, 15, 2023 the company stopped accepting new activations. All customers will be transitioned to Rogers Wireless by December 1, 2024 |
| Sears Connect | Rogers Wireless | | As of November, 15, 2023 the company stopped accepting new activations. All customers will be transitioned to Rogers Wireless by December 1, 2024 |
| Simply Connect | Rogers Wireless | | As of November, 15, 2023 the company stopped accepting new activations. All customers will be transitioned to Rogers Wireless by December 1, 2024 |
| Zoomer Wireless | Rogers Wireless | | As of November, 15, 2023 the company stopped accepting new activations. All customers will be transitioned to Rogers Wireless by December 1, 2024 |

== Defunct, merged and acquired operators ==
Some operators listed below may still function as a separate brand but they no longer own any infrastructure (towers, network, etc.).

| Operator | Ownership | Voice technology | Data technology | End date | Notes |
|---|---|---|---|---|---|
| AGT Cellular | Alberta Government Telephones | AMPS | | 1996 | In 1996, the AGT and Ed Tel brands were retired in favour of the Telus name |
| CityWest | CityWest | GSM | EDGE | December 13, 2013 | Wireless services discontinued; mobile customers transitioned to Telus |
| Bell Aliant | Bell Aliant | CDMA | | 2006 | Wireless services discontinued, migrated to Bell Mobility. |
| Bell MTS Mobility | Bell MTS | CDMA | | October, 2018 | Wireless services discontinued, migrated to Bell Mobility. |
| BC Cellular | Bell MTS | AMPS | | 1999 | Network merged with Telus |
| Clearnet | Clearnet Communications | CDMA2000 | EV-DO | 2000 | Network merged with Telus |
| Dryden Municipal Telephone Service | Dryden Municipal Telephone Service | GSM, CDMA2000 | EDGE, EV-DO | December 21, 2012 | Wireless customers migrated to Tbaytel |
| EdTel Mobility | Edmonton Tel | AMPS | | 1995 | Purchased by the newly formed Telus in 1995. In 1996, the AGT and Ed Tel brands were retired in favour of the Telus name. |
| Fido | Microcell | GSM | EDGE | November 8, 2004 | Network merged with Rogers; continues to operate as an MVNO. |
| Freedom Mobile | Shaw | GSM, UMTS, VoLTE | EDGE, HSPA+, LTE | December 21, 2023 | Network merged with Videotron; continues to operate as an MVNO. |
| Kenora Municipal Telephone Service (KMTS) | Kenora Municipal Telephone Service | CDMA2000 | EV-DO | February 2008 | Acquired by Bell Aliant. |
| Lynx Mobility | Lynx Mobility | GSM | EDGE | March 2018 | Ceased operations. |
| Mobilicity | DAVE Wireless | UMTS | HSPA+ | 2016 | Acquired by Rogers Wireless; customers transitioned to Chatr Mobile. |
| NorthernTel Mobility | NorthernTel Mobility | | | July 19, 2015 | NorthernTel Mobility wireless subscribers moved to Bell Mobility. |
| Northwestel | Northwestel | | | June 19, 2014 | Wireless services discontinued, sold to Bell Mobility. |
| Public Mobile | Public Mobile | CDMA2000 | EV-DO | August 8, 2014 | Acquired by Telus; CDMA network decommissioned, continues to operate as a Telus MVNO |
| Superior Wireless | Superior Wireless | CDMA2000 | EV-DO | August 2006 | Merged with TBayTel |
| Télébec Mobilité | Télébec | | | February 2007 | Télébec Mobilité wireless subscribers moved to Bell Aliant. |
| TNW | Investel Capital | 3G | | | |

== eSIM networks in Canada ==
The adoption of eSIM (embedded SIM) technology has increased among Canadian mobile network operators, enabling users to activate cellular service without the need for a physical SIM card. Major carriers, including Bell Mobility, Rogers, and Telus, have integrated eSIM support into their postpaid and select prepaid plans, facilitating greater flexibility for consumers.

== See also ==
- Internet in Canada
- Mobile country code#Canada - CA
- List of Canadian electric utilities
- List of Canadian telephone companies
- List of telephone operating companies
- List of mobile network operators
- List of mobile network operators of the Americas#Canada
- List of United States wireless communications service providers
