= Independent telephone company =

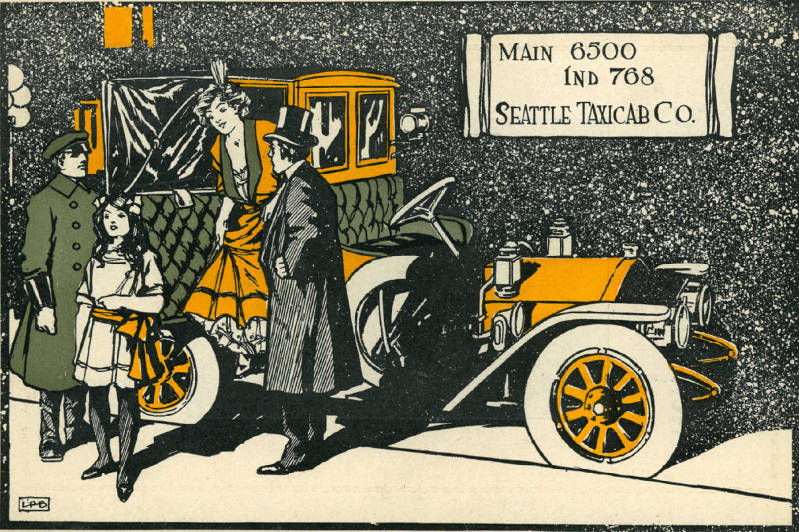
This 1911 advertisement from Seattle shows phone numbers from two different phone companies; the exchanges were not interconnected.

An independent telephone company was a telephone company providing local service in the United States or Canada that was not part of the Bell System organized by American Telephone and Telegraph. Independent telephone companies usually operated in many rural or sparsely populated areas.

== United States ==
The second fundamental Bell patent for telephones expired on January 30, 1894, which provided an opportunity for independent companies to provide telephone services, although some had been established before that date. The Strowger Automatic Telephone Exchange company had been formed on October 30, 1891. The first Strowger switch went into operation on November 3, 1892, in LaPorte, Indiana, with 75 subscribers and capacity for 99. Independent manufacturing companies were established, such as Stromberg-Carlson in 1894 and Kellogg Switchboard & Supply Company in 1897.

By 1903 while the Bell system had 1,278,000 subscribers on 1,514 main exchanges, the independents, excluding non-profit rural cooperatives, claimed about 2 million subscribers on 6,150 exchanges.

The size ranged from small mom and pop companies run by a husband and wife team, to large independent companies, such as General Telephone & Electronics (GTE), Associated Telephone, United Telecom, Continental Telephone and Central Telephone, which resembled the Bell system in being vertically integrated with local operating companies, long line (toll) companies and manufacturing companies. GTE was the largest non-Bell domestic telephone company. Mom-and-pop companies were largely manually operated until the wide adoption of the Class 5 telephone switch providing local automatic service. Much of this equipment was manufactured by the Automatic Electric Company, Stromberg-Carlson, and the Kellogg Switchboard & Supply Company.

From 1949, the Rural Electrification Authority (REA), now the Rural Utilities Service, could provide assistance to telephone co-operatives to extend telephone service in rural areas.

The voice of the smaller independents were the two magazines, Telephony and Telephone Engineer and Management (TE&M), both from Chicago. The United States Independent Telephone Association (USITA), their trade association, became the United States Telecom Association.

Bryant Pond in Woodstock, Maine was known as having the last manual magneto (hand-crank) telephone exchange in America. The family-owned Bryant Pond Telephone Company was operated from a two-position magneto switchboard in the living room of owners Barbara and Elden Hathaway. In 1981, the company was purchased by the Oxford County Telephone & Telegraph Company, a nearby larger independent company, and automatic service was provided in 1983.

== Canada ==
In Canada, Bell Canada has a dominant position as a local service provider, particularly east of Manitoba and in the Northern territories, mostly through subsidiaries in Ontario and Quebec, and entirely through subsidiaries beyond those two provinces. The remaining independent telephone companies are in British Columbia, Ontario and Quebec; all but three independents in Alberta, Saskatchewan, Manitoba, the Atlantic provinces and the northern territories were acquired by dominant provincial carriers by the 1970s, leaving some 55 independents mostly in Ontario. The dominant provincial carriers were Alberta Government Telephones (AGT), BC Tel , Manitoba Telephone System, New Brunswick Telephone Co. (Bell subsidiary since the 1960s), Newfoundland Telephone (Bell subsidiary since the 1960s), Maritime Telegraph & Telephone (Nova Scotia), Island Tel (P.E.I.) and SaskTel. Bell and the eight provincial carriers participated in the Trans-Canada Telephone System, later known as Telecom Canada. Northwestel was the largest independent by land area covered that was not included in Telecom Canada; other large independents, by customer share, were Edmonton Telephones and Thunder Bay Telephone.

More restructuring, mergers and acquisitions, and the introduction of competition and mergers between competitors and some provincial carriers, resulted in the disappearance of Telecom Canada; "independent" is no longer distinguished as a formal alliance, but now as a comparison of size and share of ILEC lines. By 2001, Bell Canada remained the dominant incumbent LEC carrier in Ontario and urban areas of Quebec; Telus dominated in Alberta and B.C., Aliant Telecom encompassed all four Atlantic provinces plus former Bell areas in rural Ontario and Quebec; SaskTel remains a distinct provincial carrier; MTS encompasses Manitoba's former provincial company (Bell Canada purchased MTS in 2017; it is currently known as Bell MTS). Telus and Bell are competitors in each other's territory. There are still some independent companies in Ontario and Quebec, and one in British Columbia.

== See also ==
- List of United States telephone companies
- List of Canadian telephone companies
- Canadian Independent Telephone Association
- Telephone in United States history
