= Strowger =

Strowger may refer to:

- Strowger switch, automatic telephone exchange equipment
- Strowger Automatic Telephone Exchange Company, the company that manufactured Strowger switches
- Almon Brown Strowger (1839–1902), who invented the principle of the Strowger switch in 1888

== See also ==
- Stroger (disambiguation)
