= Canadian Independent Telephone Association =

The Canadian Independent Telephone Association, now the Canadian Independent Telecommunications Association, is a nationwide association of companies that provide telephone service within British Columbia, Ontario and Quebec, founded in 1905.

== Active Members List ==
Active members list as of December 2023

- Brooke Telecom
- Bruce Telecom
- CityWest Tel
- Cochrane Telecom Service
- CoopTel
- Execulink Telecom
- Gosfield North Communications
- Hay Communications
- Huron Telecommunications
- Lansdowne Rural Telephone
- Mornington Communications
- Nexicom Telecommunications
- North Frontenac Telephone Corp.
- North Renfrew Telephone Company
- Quadro Communications
- Roxborough Telephone Co. Ltd.
- Sogetel
- TBayTel
- Tuckersmith Communications
- Wightman Telecom
- WTC Communications

== See also ==
- Stentor Alliance
- Public utilities commission
- List of Canadian telephone companies
- List of Canadian mobile phone companies
- List of telecommunications regulatory bodies
