= Matrix Business Technologies =

Telecommunications company

Matrix Telecom, Inc
- Company type: Private company
- Industry: Telecommunications, Internet service provider
- Founded: 1990
- Headquarters: Dallas, Texas
- Key people: Jerry Ou, President & CEO; Mike Simpson, CFO
- Products: Local Voice Service Long Distance Voice Service, T1, DSL, IP VPN, Audio Conferencing, Web Conferencing
- Number of employees: 300
- Website: www.matrixbt.com

Matrix Telecom, Inc., operating as Matrix Business Technologies, Trinsic, Powered by Matrix, Excel Telecommunications and various other niche brands is a United States telecommunications firm that provides voice and data services to consumers and small and medium businesses as well as multi-location distributed enterprise markets (national chains). The firm also provides wholesale voice services to the telecommunications, wireless and cable industries.

Headquartered in Dallas, Texas with operations in Atmore, Alabama Matrix employs approximately 300 people. The company was founded in 1990.

Matrix is licensed as a facilities-based CLEC and long distance calling provider in 49 states and the District of Columbia (DC). In 1995, Matrix was recognized by Inc. Magazine as one of the fastest-growing private companies in the United States ranking #7 in the United States and #1 in the state of Texas and remained on the list the following year.

== History ==
In 1999, Matrix was acquired by Platinum Equity, a global private investment firm specializing in M&A&O.

In 2001, Matrix integrated Staples Communications (Staples, Inc.) customers into its operations through an acquisition made by Platinum Equity, and with the purchase of Global Crossing’s Small Business Group in 2005, Matrix launched the Matrix Business Technologies brand to differentiate and focus its market presence between residential and commercial services.

Platinum Equity acquired the assets of Trinsic Communications (formerly Z-Tel) in June 2007 and integrated them into Matrix, This addition deepened the residential customer base within Matrix and broadened its national footprint of services. The brand was changed to "Trinsic, Powered by Matrix"

On March 16, 2010, Matrix announced it would acquire the customers and substantially all the assets of Dallas-based Excel Telecommunications. That transaction closed on August 2, 2010, with the Excel headquarters in Irving, Texas becoming the new headquarters for the combined companies.

In addition to its own Veraz softswitch-based network, Matrix’s network partners include Global Crossing, Verizon Business, XO Communications, Paetec, Level 3), Covad, AT&T, Qwest, IBM and Intercall.

== Services ==
Matrix offers include:

- Local Voice Service
- Long distance Voice Service
- Wholesale Switched Long Distance
- Wholesale Dedicated Long Distance
- Toll Free service
- Switched Toll Free
- Dedicated Toll Free
- Integrated Voice/Internet T1
- Dedicated T1
- IP VPN
- DSL
- Audio Conferencing
- Web Conferencing

== See also ==
- List of United States telephone companies
