= List of companies in Burnaby =

List of companies in Burnaby includes companies that are/were headquartered or based their operations in Burnaby, British Columbia, Canada.

== B ==
- Ballard Power Systems
- Best Buy Canada
- Blue Castle Games

== C ==
- Canada Wide Media
- Cityfone
- Clio (software company)
- Creo

== D ==
- D-Wave Systems

== E ==
- EA Canada

== F ==
- Freshslice Pizza
- Future Shop (merged with Best Buy)

== G ==
- Glentel
- Global News: BC 1

== I ==
- Inex Pharmaceuticals
- Ironclad Games

== K ==
- Knowledge Network

== P ==
- Pacific Blue Cross
- PMC-Sierra
- Petro-Canada
