= DMTS =

DMTS may be:

- Dimethyl trisulfide, a chemical compound
- Dryden Municipal Telephone Service
