= Garmin-ASUS =

Alliance between Garmin and ASUS

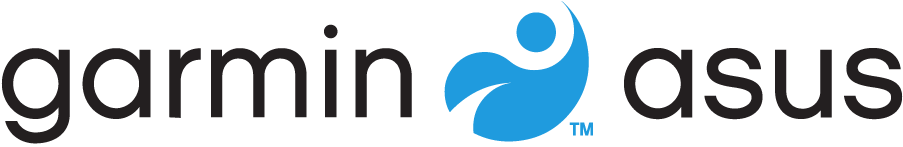
- Company type: Alliance
- Industry: Mobile phone
- Founded: February 4, 2009; 16 years ago
- Founder: Garmin; ASUS
- Defunct: October 26, 2010
- Headquarters: Olathe, Kansas, USA
- Area served: Worldwide
- Products: Nüvifone series
- Parent: Garmin; ASUS
- Website: www.garminasus.com

Garmin-ASUS was a strategic alliance between electronics companies Garmin and ASUS, active in the production of Nüvifone mobile phones.

== History ==
The alliance was born on February 4, 2009, and since then several models have been launched: G60, M20, M19, M10E, A10 and A50.

On October 26, 2010 Garmin announced the stop of production of Nüvifone and therefore the end of the alliance.

== See also ==
- ASUS
- Dashtop mobile
- Garmin
- Garmin-ASUS Nüvifone
