= List of public utilities =

This is a list of public utilities.

== Natural gas companies ==
- Barbados - National Petroleum Corporation, Barbados National Oil Company Ltd.
- Brazil - Comgás
- Canada - List of Canadian natural gas companies
- China - China Natural Gas, Towngas China
  - Hong Kong - China Resources Gas, The Hong Kong and China Gas Company
- Egypt - EGAS
- France - List of French natural gas companies
- Japan - List of Japan natural gas companies
- Malaysia - Petronas
- Pakistan - Sui Northern Gas Pipelines Limited, Sui Southern Gas Company Limited
- Spain - Endesa, Iberdrola, Naturgy, Repsol, TotalEnergies
- Taiwan - CPC Corporation
- Thailand - PTT
- United Kingdom - List of British natural gas companies
- United States - List of United States natural gas companies

== Electricity companies ==
- Australia - Lumo Energy, EnergyAustralia, Origin Energy, TRUenergy, SEC Victoria (fmr.), Powercor, Click Energy, AGL, Alinta, Citipower, ETSA Utilities, Western Power, Country Energy, Energex, Integral Energy, ActewAGL, Ergon Energy, Power and Water
- Bangladesh - Summit Group, Power Grid Company of Bangladesh Ltd, Electricity Generation Company of Bangladesh Ltd
- Barbados - Barbados Light and Power Company Ltd.
- Belgium - Electrabel
- Botswana - Botswana Power Corporation
- Brazil - Eletrobrás, AES Eletropaulo, CPFL Energia, Celesc, CEMIG, CESP, Copel, Light S.A., CEEE, Energisa
- Canada - List of Canadian electric utilities
- China - State Grid Corporation, China Southern Power Grid
  - Hong Kong - Hongkong Electric, CLP Power
  - Macau - Companhia de Electricidade de Macau
- Cuba - Union Electrica
- Czech Republic - CEZ Group
- Egypt - Egyptian Electricity Holding Company
- Ethiopia - Ethiopian Electric Power Corporation
- Finland - Fortum
- France - EDF, Engie, List of French electric utilities
- Germany - E.ON, RWE, EnBW
- Greece - PPC (DEI) (Greek Hydro), List of electric power companies in Greece
- Iceland - Orkuveita Reykjavíkur
- India - List of Electricity Organizations in India, India: NTPC, Power Grid Corporation of India Ltd.(PGCIL), KPTCL, MSEB, Tata Power, BSES Rajdhani Power Ltd New Delhi, BSES Yamuna Power Ltd New Delhi
- Indonesia - Perusahaan Listrik Negara
- Italy - Enel, Edison, A2A, ACEA, Hera, Sorgenia
- Japan - Kansai Electric Power, Tokyo Electric Power, Chubu Electric Power, Chugoku Electric Power, Hokuriku Electric Power, Hokkaido Electric Power, Kyushu Electric Power, Tohoku Electric Power, Shikoku Electric Power, Okinawa Electric Power, J-POWER
- Libya - Gecol
- Malaysia - Tenaga Nasional Berhad
- New Zealand - Genesis Energy, Mercury Energy, Meridian Energy, Transpower
- Norway - Statnett
- Philippines - Meralco
- Singapore - Singapore Power
- South Africa - Eskom
- South Korea - Korea Electric Power Corporation
- Spain - Endesa, Iberdrola, Naturgy, Repsol, TotalEnergies
- Sweden - Vattenfall
- Taiwan - Taiwan Power Company
- Thailand - Electricity Generating Authority of Thailand, Provincial Electricity Authority, Metropolitan Electricity Authority
- United Kingdom - EDF Energy, E.ON UK, National Grid, RWE npower, ScottishPower, Scottish and Southern Energy, Drax Power and Good Energy, Ecotricity, Alkane Energy, Ovo Energy
- United States - List of United States electric companies

== Telephone companies ==
- Australia - Telstra, Optus, Vodafone, Hutchison Telecom(3G network), AAPT, Primus Telecom, Nextgen Networks, Agile Communications, TransACT
- Barbados - Liberty Latin America
- Botswana - Botswana Telecommunications Corporation
- Brazil - Brasil Telecom, Oi, Vivo, TIM, Telefónica Brasil
- Canada - List of Canadian telephone companies
- China
  - Hong Kong - PCCW Limited, New World Telephone, Hutchison Telecom
  - Macau - Companhia de Telecomunicações de Macau
- Cuba - ETECSA
- Egypt - telecom egypt, orange egypt, vodafone egypt, etisalat egypt
- France - List of French telephone companies
- Germany - Deutsche Telekom, Arcor AG, Freenet AG, T-Mobile, Vodafone Germany,1&1 Aktiengesellschaft1&1 Drillisch
- Greece - Hellenic Telecommunication Organization
- India - Airtel, BSNL, MTNL, Vodafone Idea, Jio
- Indonesia - Telkom
- Ireland - Eircom, BT Ireland, Smart Telecom, Vodafone Ireland, Hutchison 3G, O2 (Telefónica Europe)
- Italy - List of Italian telephone companies
- Japan - NTT, (NTT East, and NTT West)
- Malaysia - Telekom Malaysia
- Pakistan - Mobilink, Ufone, Telenor, Zong
- Philippines - Philippine Long Distance Telephone Company
- Singapore - SingTel
- South Africa - Telkom
- Spain - Telefónica, Orange, Vodafone, Yoigo
- Taiwan - Chunghwa Telecom, FarEasTone, Taiwan Mobile
- Thailand - TOT, CAT Telecom, True Corporation, DTAC, AIS, JAS Mobile
- United States - List of United States telephone companies

== Water companies ==
- Australia - Unitywater, Queensland Urban Utilities
- Barbados - Barbados Water Authority
- Botswana - Water Utilities Corporation
- Brazil - Sabesp, Sanepar, Copasa, Semasa
- China
  - Hong Kong - Water Supplies Department
  - Macau - Macao Water
- Egypt - Holding company for water and wastewater, Alexandria Water Company
- France - SAUR, Suez Environnement, Veolia Environnement
- Greece - EYDAP
- Ireland - Irish Water
- Italy - Hera, Seabo
- Philippines - Maynilad Water Services, Manila Water Company, Inc., Metropolitan Waterworks and Sewerage System
- Spain - Canal de Isabel II, Grupo Agbar
- Taiwan - Taiwan Water Corporation
- United Kingdom - List of United Kingdom water companies
- United States - List of United States water companies

== Steam companies ==
Note: some of these companies are still trading, others are listed here for historical interest.

- American District Steam Company
- Boston Heating Company
- Compagnie Parisienne de Chauffage Urbain
- Detroit Thermal
- New York Steam Company, now Con Edison Steam Operations
- Trigen Energy Corporation

== Former hydraulic power companies ==
- Itaipú Binacional *Brazil
- Liverpool Hydraulic Power Company *UK
- London Hydraulic Power Company, defunct since 1977 *UK

== See also ==
- Off-the-grid
