= Leich Electric =

American telecommunications equipment manufacturer

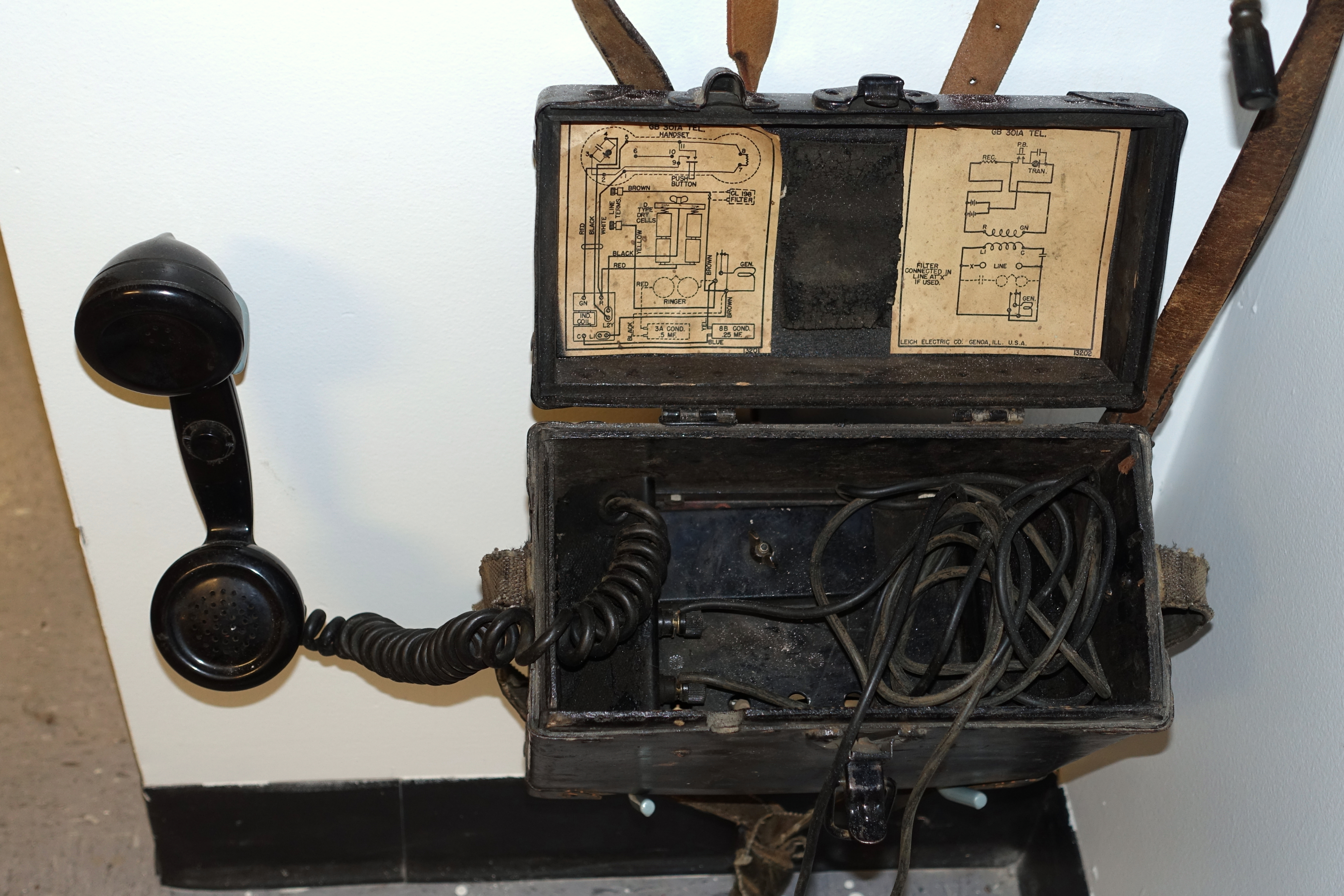
Leich Electric GB 301A field telephone

Leich Electric was a manufacturing company of telecommunications equipment in the United States. Leich produced telephone sets, switchboards, telephone exchange equipment, and associated tools and materials for the independent telephone market in the United States and Canada.

The company was created as the Cracraft-Leich Electric Company as a result of a merger of the Advance Electric Company and the Eureka Electric Company. The name was changed to the Leich Electric Co. in 1917. In 1950 it was acquired by General Telephone Corporation. GTE grouped the company with another acquisition, the Automatic Electric Company, for which Leich also manufactured telephone sets.

Leich Electric was located in Genoa, Illinois in 1903, after its predecessors had been located in McCordsville, Indiana and Chicago, Illinois.
