= List of British natural gas companies =

This is a list of British natural gas companies.

Exploration and production:

- Cuadrilla Resources
- IGas Energy

Utilities:

- British Gas (also uses Scottish Gas and Nwy Prydain brands) (parent company Centrica)
- EDF Energy (parent of London Energy, Seeboard and SWEB Energy)
- Npower (parent company RWE)
- Powergen Retail (parent Company E.ON)
- SSE (parent of Scottish Hydro, Southern Electric and Swalec)
- ScottishPower
- TotalEnergies Gas & Power
- Bulb
- Ovo Energy
- British Natural Gas (known as HM British Natural Gas Ltd)

Other companies:

- National Grid, previously known as Transco

== See also ==
- Lists of public utilities
- Npower UK
