= Stroger =

The following things all have the name Stroger:

== People ==
- Bob Stroger, American blues singer and bassist
- John Stroger, first African-American president of the Cook County Board of Commissioners
- Todd Stroger, Cook County board president, son of John

== Places ==
- John H. Stroger, Jr. Hospital of Cook County, hospital named after John Stroger

== See also ==
- Strowger (disambiguation)
