= Automatic Electric =

American telecommunications equipment manufacturer

Automatic Electric Group
- Trade name: Automatic Electric
- Industry: Electronic manufacturing
- Predecessor: Strowger Automatic Telephone Exchange Company (1891)
- Founded: 1901; 125 years ago, in Chicago, Illinois
- Founder: Almon B. Strowger
- Defunct: 1983; 43 years ago
- Fate: Merged to GTE Network Systems in 1983
- Successor: Now part of Nokia
- Headquarters: Chicago, Illinois, United States of America
- Area served: US, Canada, Europe
- Products: Automatic switching systems and telephones
- Parent: Theodore Gary & Company, later GTE

Automatic Electric Company (A.E. Co.) was an American telephone equipment supplier primarily for independent telephone companies in North America, but also had a worldwide presence. With its line of automatic telephone exchanges, it was also a long-term supplier of switching equipment to the Bell System, starting in 1919. The company was the largest manufacturing unit of the Automatic Electric Group. In 1955, the company was acquired by General Telephone and Electronics (GT&E). After numerous reorganization within GTE, the company's assets came under the umbrella of Lucent in the 1990s, and subsequently part of Nokia.

== History ==
In 1889, Almon Strowger, of Kansas City, Missouri, was inspired by the idea of manufacturing automatic telephone exchanges that would not require switchboard operators. He founded the Strowger Automatic Telephone Exchange Company in 1891, which held the first patents for the automatic telephone exchange. In 1901, with the construction of a new company manufacturing plant at Morgan and Van Buren Streets in West Chicago, Strowger helped form the Automatic Electric Company to which he leased his patents exclusively.

Automatic switches based on the Strowger system proliferated in independent telephone companies in the 1910s and 1920s, well before the Bell System started deployment of Panel switch technology in the 1910s. In 1919, the Bell System was impacted considerably by organized operator strikes and the leadership abandoned its rejection of automatic switching equipment. As a result, Automatic Electric became a long-term supplier of step-by-step switching equipment to the Bell System for installations where the large-scale Panel system was not economical.

General Telephone and Electronics (GT&E) acquired Automatic Electric through a merger with Theodore Gary & Company in 1955, and continued operating the unit into the 1980s. Lenkurt, a manufacturer of carrier equipment, was purchased by GT&E in 1959, and held separately from Automatic Electric.

In 1983, GTE merged Automatic Electric and Lenkurt into GTE Network Systems, which was quickly renamed GTE Communication Systems when AT&T announced the renaming of Western Electric as AT&T Network Systems. GTE Microcircuits, the microelectronics division of GTE Communication Systems known for its G65SC12 CMOS version of the then popular 6502 microprocessor, was sold to California Micro Devices in 1987. In 1989, the remaining assets of the company were placed into a joint venture between AT&T and GTE called AG Communication Systems (the A and G respectively standing for the partners' names). At the same time, GTE Communications systems spun off their interconnect business to a joint venture called Fujitsu GTE, later to be renamed as Fujitsu Business Communication Systems, Inc. AG Communication Systems ceased separate existence in 2004, and became fully incorporated into Lucent, subsequently Alcatel-Lucent and then Nokia. Alcatel-Lucent also owned many of the assets of the Western Electric Company, Automatic Electric's former rival and Bell System counterpart.

== Facilities ==
With the corporate establishment of the Automatic Electric Company in 1901, the facilities of the Automatic Electric Company were located in a six-story complex erected at the intersection of Morgan Street and Van Buren Street in the western part of Chicago.

In 1957, Automatic Electric was relocated to Northlake, Illinois, and maintained research and development facilities in Melrose Park and Elmhurst, Illinois. The company acquired a manufacturing facility in Genoa, Illinois, from Leich Electric, and, in 1978, opened a research and development branch in Phoenix, Arizona. In the mid-1960s, a manufacturing plant was built in Huntsville, Alabama. Public coin-operated telephones and the Styleline series of consumer telephones were manufactured there. A smaller rental telephone refurbishment operation was also moved to the Huntsville plant in the 1970s. The plant was closed in the mid-1980s as domestic labour and production costs rose sharply against overseas competitors.

In Canada, Automatic Electric acquired Phillips Electric Works, a cable factory in Brockville, Ontario, in 1930. Telephones were manufactured at that facility from 1935 to 1953, when Automatic Electric sold the cable plant and built a 33-acre, $1.5 million telephone factory at 100 Strowger Boulevard. The Strowger Boulevard factory was sold to BC Tel (as Microtel) in 1979, then was owned by Nortel (as Brock Telecom) from 1990 to 1999; it closed in 2002. The Phillips Cables factory closed in the 1990s and was later demolished.

In England, the Automatic Telephone Manufacturing Company Ltd. operated a manufacturing plant in Liverpool. British Insulated Cables had founded the company in November 1911 to manufacture the Strowger system under licence from the Automatic Electric Company of Chicago. The first maker of automatic exchanges in the UK, this company (as of 1923) was one of four (later five) which manufactured equipment for Post Office-owned central offices; see General Post Office (GPO or BPO, a government department).. The company became part of International Automatic Telephone Co. in 1920, which changed name to Automatic Electric Co. in 1932 and then to Automatic Telephone and Electric Co. in 1936 to reflect a product range which included sidelines ranging from Xcel heating appliances to traffic signals.

In the 1950s, two Automatic Electric factories were manufacturing in Europe: Automatique Electric SA of Antwerp, Belgium, and Autelco Mediterranea SATAP of Milan, Italy.

== Products ==
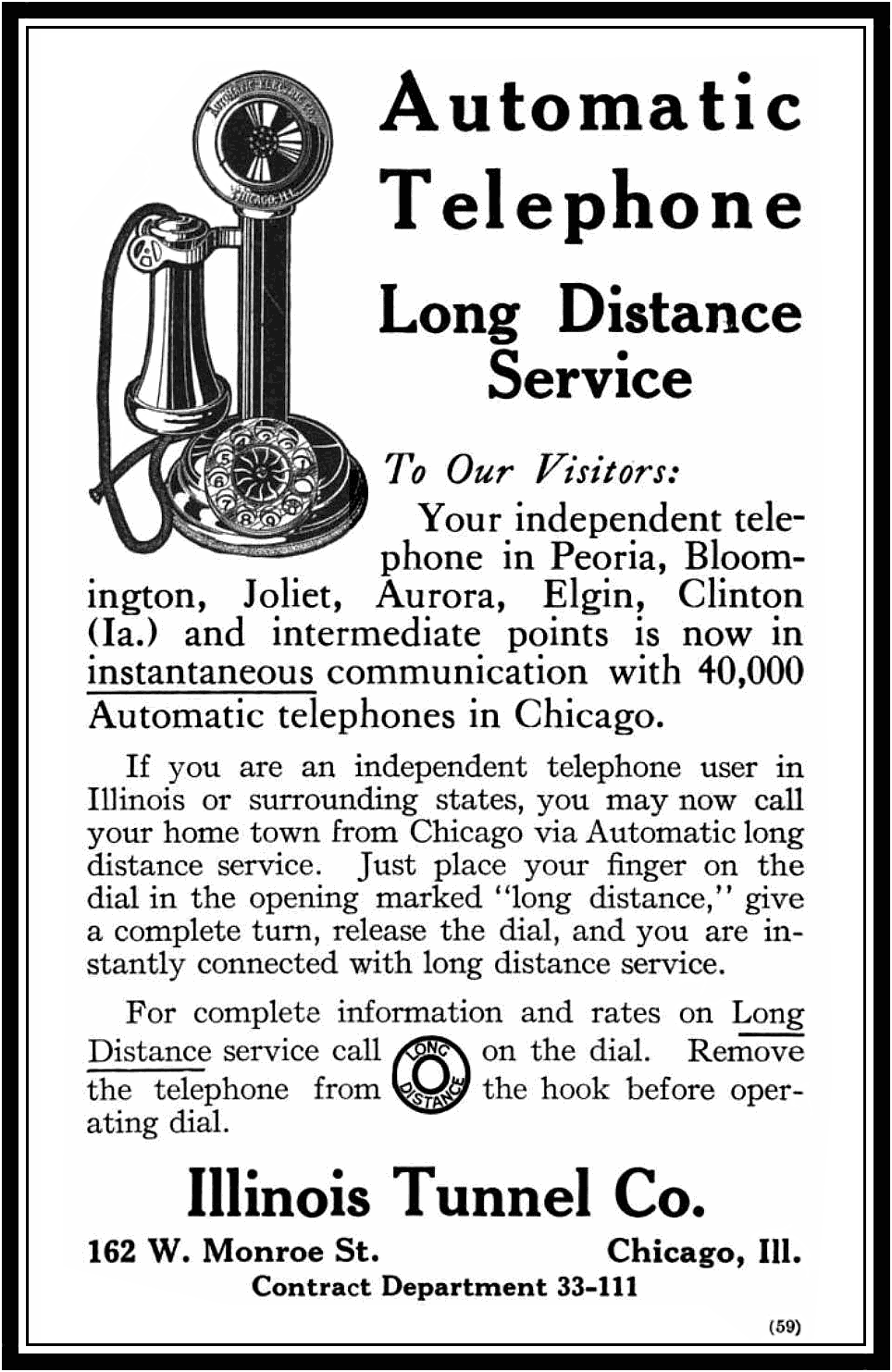
1910 advertisement explaining the use of an Automatic Electric dial telephone for placing long-distance calls. The Illinois Tunnel Company in Chicago was one of the largest early users of Automatic Electric equipment.

As its principal product line, Automatic Electric manufactured automatic stepping switches (specifically, "Strowger switches") which had enabled Strowger's vision. These switches allowed customers to connect their own calls without operator assistance.

Automatic Electric's rotary dial makes a single clicking sound as it is released but is otherwise fairly silent, while Western Electric's rotary dial has a distinctive whirring sound as the dial returns to the normal position. Many Automatic Electric telephones use a distinctive dual-gong ringer, the low and high tones of which are a perfect fifth apart, in contrast to the typical third interval of most Western Electric ringers.

The GTD-5 EAX, GTE Automatic Electric's digital class 4/5 central office telephone switch, was first deployed on June 26, 1982.
