= List of French natural gas companies =

This is a list of French natural gas companies :

- Altergaz
- Antargaz (Parent company : UGI Corporation)
- Direct Énergie
- EDF
- Engie
- Poweo
- Réseau GDS/Énerest (formerly named Gaz de Strasbourg)

== See also ==
- Lists of public utilities
