= Energex =

Australian government-owned electricity company

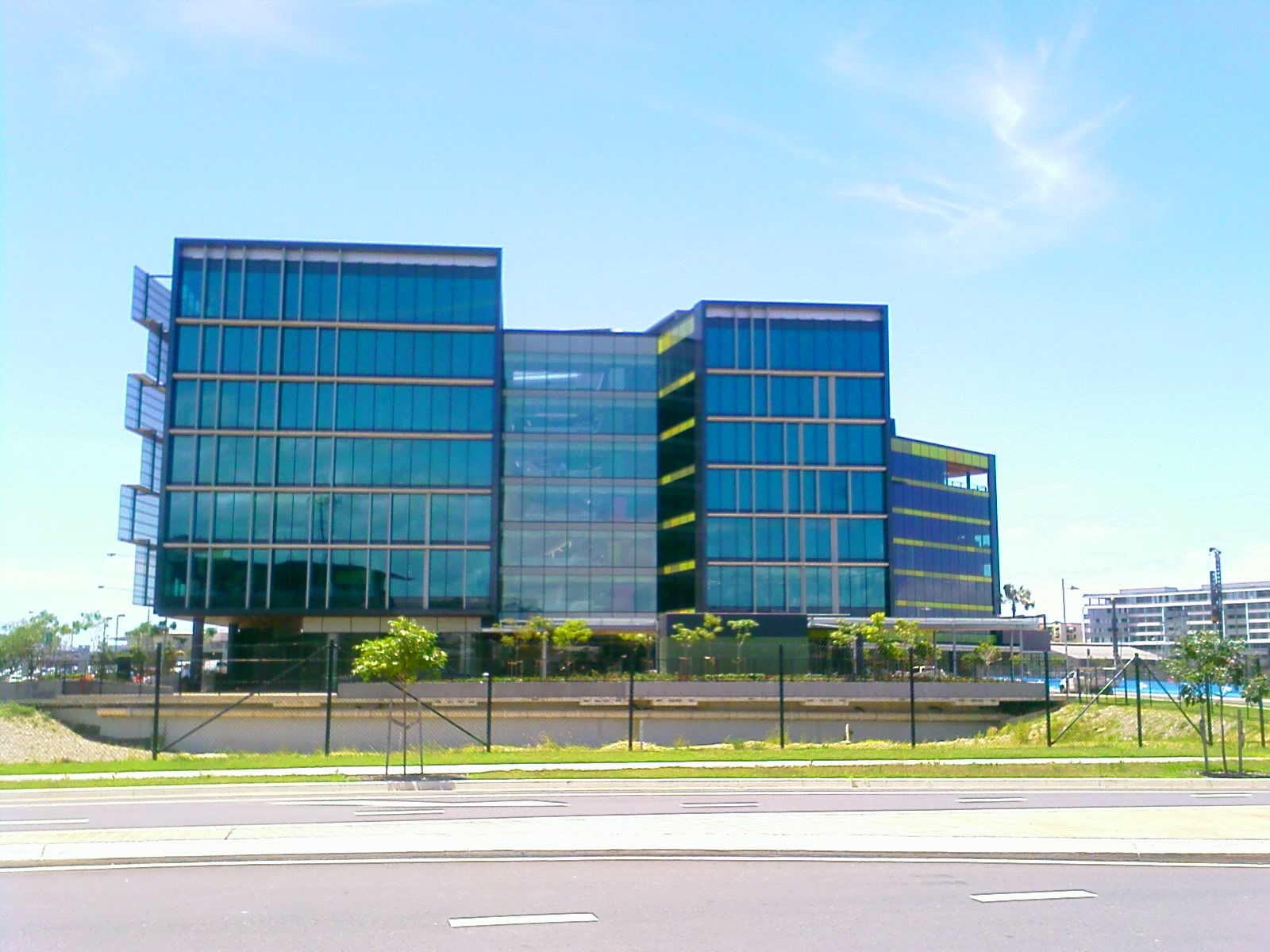
- The Cox Rayner/BVN Donovan Hill-designed Energex headquarters at Newstead
- Company type: Government owned corporation
- Industry: Energy
- Predecessor: South East Queensland Electricity Board
- Founded: 1995
- Headquarters: Newstead, Queensland, Australia
- Area served: South East Queensland
- Key people: Peter Scott, Chief Executive Officer of Energy Queensland Sarah Zeljko, Chairperson of Energy Queensland
- Products: Commercial and residential energy
- Revenue: A$5.289 billion (Energy Queensland 2022-23)
- Total assets: A$29.2 billion (Energy Queensland 2022-23)
- Owner: Queensland Government
- Number of employees: 7,342 (2019)
- Parent: Energy Queensland
- Website: energex.com.au

Energex is an Australian-based and wholly Queensland Government-owned electricity company that distributes power to 1.5 million homes and businesses across the region of South East Queensland. The boundaries of the company’s distribution area stretch from Coolangatta in the south to Gympie in the north and as far west as the foothills of the Toowoomba range.

Energex’s network includes more than 55,000 km of underground and overhead electricity infrastructure servicing city and rural areas in a sub-tropical climate.

As part of the Queensland Government's announcement of the merger of Energex and Ergon Energy, a parent entity called Energy Queensland was formed, and commenced operations on 30 June 2016. The head office of Energy Queensland is based in Townsville.

== History ==
The earliest permanent electricity supplies in Brisbane were provided by Barton, White & Company, from 1887; this became known as Brisbane Electric Supply Company in 1904, and in 1922 was renamed the City Electric Light Company (CEL).

For more than three decades, CEL competed with other electricity suppliers in South East Queensland, especially the Brisbane City Council (BCC) Electricity Supply Department. In 1961, the Queensland government nationalised CEL and merged it with both the BCC Electricity Supply and Toowoomba Electric Light & Power Company. The merged entity was known initially as Southern Electric Authority of Queensland (SEAQ). The organisation, which was the sole provider of electricity in SEQ, was known between 1977 and 1997 as the South East Queensland Electricity Board (SEQEB).

Following the formation of the National Electricity Market (NEM), SEQEB was corporatised in 1997, and renamed Energex then established itself as a multi-utility provider, supplying electricity and LPG and natural gas.

In 2006, Energex sold its gas distribution network (Allgas) in southeast Queensland to Australian Pipeline Trust for $521 million. The electricity distribution network remains in public ownership.

In 2014, a whistleblower made allegations against Energex that prompted a federal parliamentary inquiry into whether data had been manipulated to artificially inflate power prices.

== Retail operations sale ==
Sun Retail, the retail arm of Energex, was sold at auction to Origin Energy Ltd for A$1.2 billion. The sale was formally effected in early 2007.

Origin Energy purchased a customer base of approximately 800,000 from the New South Wales border to a line just north of the Brisbane River (mostly following Kedron Brook), whilst AGL Energy purchased a customer base of the remaining approximately 400,000 customers north from this line to Gympie and the Sunshine Coast.

Full retail contestability since 1 July 2007 allows electricity customers to choose their electricity retailer. About 19 new retailers (including Origin and AGL) have entered into the Queensland market.

== Queensland Government Merger Electricity Distribution Businesses ==
When Labor won the Queensland State election in late 2015, the Government announced that rather than a sale of the State owned electricity assets, the two State distributors, Energex and Ergon Energy would merge into a single entity - to be known as Energy Queensland. This merger was completed on 30 June 2016, however the separate branding of the two distribution companies continue. The corporate head office was located in Townsville, Qld as part of a jobs drive for the North Qld regions.

== Energex Service ==
Energex provides a 24-hour emergency phone service, to report life-threatening emergencies and fallen powerlines on 13 19 62. A loss of supply enquiry line also operates 24 hours a day on 13 62 62. General enquiries can be made via their Contact Centre on 13 12 53 between 7am - 5.30pm Monday-Friday. They also have a Facebook and Twitter feed which is regularly updated, particularly during storm events and other large scale disaster incidents and also community events.

== See also ==
- List of public utilities
- List of Queensland Government departments
- National Electricity Market
