= List of French electric utilities =

This is a list of French electric companies:

- EDF
- Enercoop
- Engie
- Total Direct Énergie

== See also ==
- Lists of public utilities
