= Garmin-ASUS Nüvifone =

Line of Internet-enabled mobile phone and personal navigation devices

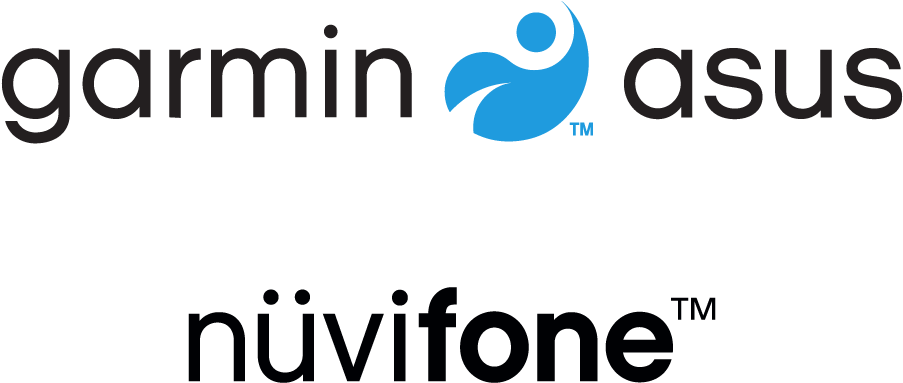

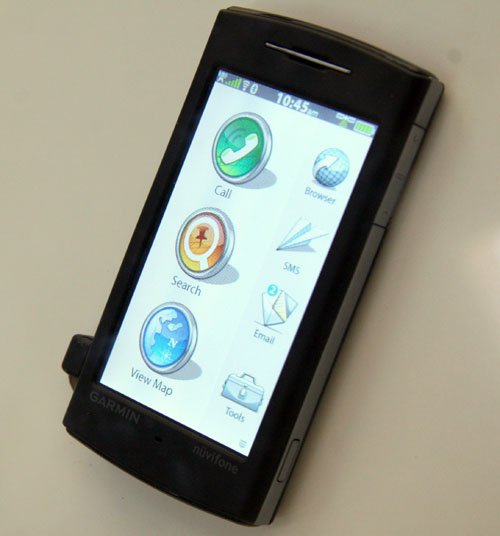
- Garmin-ASUS Nüvifone G60
- Manufacturer: Garmin-ASUS
- Availability by region: 10/4/2009 (AT&T)
- Compatible networks: Quad-band GSM; GPRS/EDGE; HSDPA
- Form factor: Candybar Smartphone
- Display: 3.5 in, color LCD
- Sound: MP3 and MPEG4/AAC
- Connectivity: WiFi, Bluetooth
- Data inputs: touchscreen
- Website: www.nuvifone.com

The Garmin-ASUS Nüvifone is a discontinued line of Internet-enabled mobile phone and personal navigation devices manufactured by Garmin-ASUS partnership. It makes use of a touchscreen with virtual keyboards and buttons.

== Description ==
Nüvifone is a 3G hybrid handset that can be docked into a vehicle mount. Once snapped onto the vehicle mount, it can automatically enable the embedded GPS navigation and simultaneously enable hands-free calls. It is featured with a geotagging built-in camera that can help recipients of the geocoded photograph trace to where the photos were taken.

== History ==
The Nüvifone product was announced on January 30, 2008 and only a prototype (presumably not fully functional) was available at the time. According to the first press release by Garmin, it was expected to be made available to market in the third quarter of 2008. A later speculation pointed to the second half of 2009.

In February 2009 it was announced that the Nüvifone would be launched as the Garmin-ASUS Nüvifone G60, as part of a series of forthcoming Garmin-ASUS Nüvifone devices. In the United States AT&T was the exclusive carrier for this model Nüvifone.

At the same time, the Garmin-ASUS Nüvifone M20 was announced for the Windows Mobile operating system. This has a 640x480 pixel VGA touchscreen, running Windows Mobile 6.1, offering tri-band GSM/EGPRS + HSPA and Wi-Fi connectivity, plus an accelerometer, a 3MP camera, 256MB of RAM, 256MB of ROM and 4GB (8GB in some territories) of storage. The processor is a Qualcomm 7200A chip operating at 528 MHz. The device contained Ciao! — Garmin's location-based social networking application.

The A10 and A50 Garmin-ASUS Nüvifones were built on the Android platform, allowing users the purchase of connected service like traffic information and other accessories, plus the choice of installing thousands of free additional applications from Google Market. In Australia, the A50 was made available exclusively through the Optus carrier, coming onto the Australian market in August 2010. It came complete with an in-car cradle for using it as a GPS and supporting Garmin's "PhotoReal" junction view.

In 2010, Garmin announced it would stop making Nüvifones altogether.

== List of cell phones ==
Name	OS	Release date	Availability
NavTalk	Proprietary	1998	AMPS Networks
NavTalk GSM	Proprietary	Feb. 22, 2001	Europe
G60	Proprietary (Linux)	October 4, 2009	US (AT&T)
M20	Windows Mobile 6.1	February, 2009	Asia/Europe
M10	Windows Mobile 6.5.3	February 6, 2010	Asia/Europe
M10E	Windows Mobile 6.5.3	July, 2010	Asia/Europe
A10	Android 1.6/2.1 Eclair	July, 2010	Africa/Europe
A50	Android 1.6/2.1 Eclair (via update)	June 9, 2010	Australia (Optus)/Europe/US (T-Mobile)

== See also ==
- ASUS
- Dashtop mobile
- Garmin
- Garmin-ASUS
