= Sogetel =

Canadian telecommunications company

Sogetel inc.
- Company type: Private company
- Industry: Telecommunications
- Founded: 1892
- Headquarters: Nicolet, Quebec, Canada
- Key people: Michel Biron
- Number of employees: 180 in 2014
- Website: sogetel.com

Sogetel is a private Canadian telecommunications company founded in 1892.

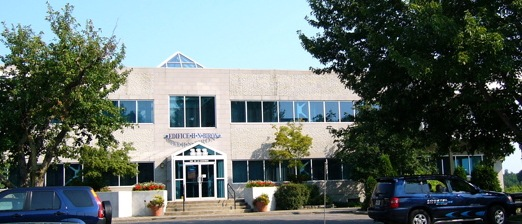
Sogetel's HQ in Nicolet.

Sogetel is a landline independent telephone company that serves multiple areas, most rural, in Quebec.

Sogetel Numérique (9164-3122 Québec Inc.) operates as a competitive local exchange carrier in various communities in Bell territory (Bell Aliant, Bell Canada and Télébec)

== Services offered ==
- Local telephony
- Cellular phone
- Internet service provider
- Web hosting

== Served areas ==
- Centre-du-Québec
- Chaudière-Appalaches
- Mauricie
- Montérégie

== Subsidiaries ==
- Sogetel Mobilité
- Sogetel Interurbain (merged into Sogetel in 2009)
- Sogetel Numérique (merged into Sogetel in 2009)
  - Sogetel Internet NTIC (merged into Sogetel Numérique in 2007)
- Téléphone Milot
  - Corporation de Téléphone de La Baie (merged into Téléphone Milot in 2007)
  - Compagnie téléphone Nantes inc. (merged into Téléphone Milot in 2008)Vi

== Other ==
Sogetel is member of :

- Independent Telecommunications Providers Association (ITPA)
- Canadian Independent Telephone Association (CITA)
