= List of Japanese natural gas companies =

This is a list of Japanese natural gas companies.

Major suppliers:

- Tokyo Gas (TYO: 9531)
- Osaka Gas (TYO: 9532)
- Toho Gas (TYO: 9533)
- Saibu Gas (TYO: 9536)

Semi-major suppliers:

- Shizuoka Gas (TYO: 9543)
- Hokkaido Gas (TYO: 9534)
- Hiroshima Gas (TYO: 9535)
- Hokuriku Gas (TYO: 9537)
- Keiyo Gas (TYO: 9539)
- Chubu Gas (NAG: 9540)
- Otaki Gas
- Shin-nihon Gas (TYO: 9542)
- Higashi-nihon Gas (TYO: 9544)

== See also ==
- List of public utilities
