= Nüvifone A50 =

Smartphone model

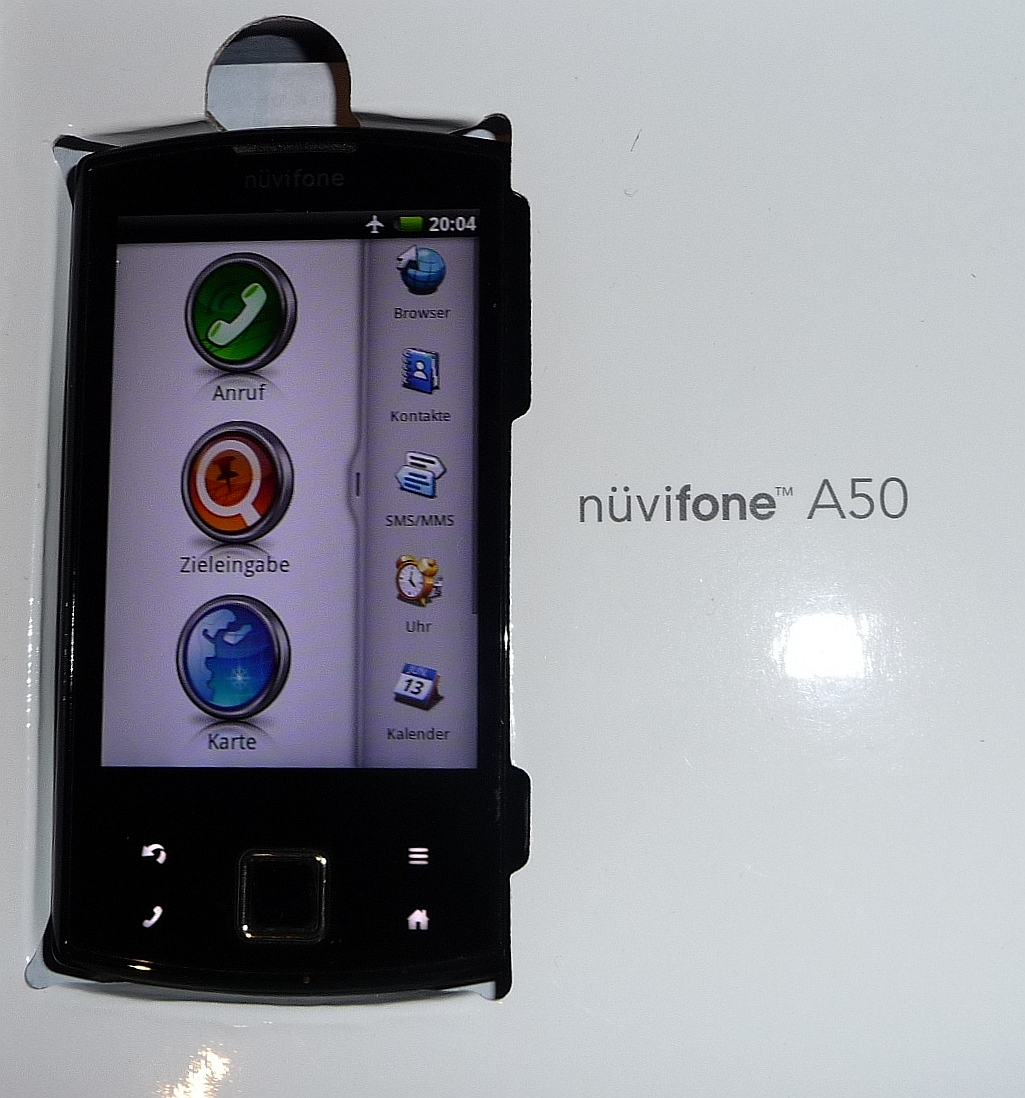
- Manufacturer: Garmin-ASUS
- Series: Nüvifone
- Compatible networks: HSDPA Cat 8 7.2Mbps; HSPA / WCDMA 850 / 900 / 1700 / 1900 / 21001; GSM 850 / 900 / 1800 / 1900; GPRS EDGE Class 10
- Form factor: Candybar Smartphone
- Display: 3.5", HVGA 320 x 480; TFT capacitive touch
- Connectivity: WLAN 802.11b+g, USB 2.0 (HS), Bluetooth 2.0
- Data inputs: touchscreen

The Garmin-ASUS Nüvifone A50 was a line of Internet-enabled mobile phones and personal navigation devices manufactured by Garmin and ASUS in partnership, first released in 2010. It has a touchscreen with virtual keyboards and buttons.

== Availability ==
In Canada, the Garmin-ASUS Nüvifone A50 was exclusive to Vidéotron Mobilité. The carrier no longer sells this smartphone.
