= List of Canadian natural gas companies =

This is a list of Canadian natural gas companies:

- ATCO - based in Edmonton, Alberta
- AltaGas - based in Calgary, Alberta
- Anderson
- Canadian Natural Resources - based in Calgary
- Dejour Energy - based in British Columbia
- Direct Energy - formerly based in Toronto and now based in Houston, Texas
- Enbridge - based in Calgary: acquired Consumers' Gas Company from British Gas
- Ferus Natural Gas Fuels (Ferus NGF) - based in Calgary, Alberta
- FortisBC - based in Kelowna, British Columbia
- Gaz Métro - based in Québec
- Manitoba Hydro - provided by Centra Gas - based in Winnipeg, Manitoba
- Pengrowth - based in Calgary
- Progress Energy Resources - based in Calgary
- SaskEnergy - based in Regina, Saskatchewan
- SemCams Natural Gas - based in Calgary
- Union Gas - based in Chatham, ON
- Tourmaline Oil - based in Calgary
- Peyto Exploration & Development - based in Calgary
