= Wundle Mobile =

Canadian prepaid mobile virtual network operator

- Type: Private
- Industry: Mobile telephony
- Founded: 2020; 6 years ago
- Founder: Luke MacKay
- Headquarters: Suite 500; 600 Bay Street; Toronto, Canada; M5G 1M6
- Website: www.wundle.ca

Wundle Mobile is a Canadian mobile virtual network operator (MVNO) using the Rogers Wireless network. Established in 2020, the company is based out of downtown Toronto. All phone plans offered are month-to-month prepaid and no contract, emphasizing the company's flexible approach. Telecommunications services operate primarily under 5G, with 4G LTE used outside designated coverage areas. Both physical SIM card as well as eSIM activation is available. Most of the standard plans cover North America (US/Mexico) with unlimited texting-talking.
