= Almon Brown Strowger =

American inventor of the telephone exchange (1839–1902)

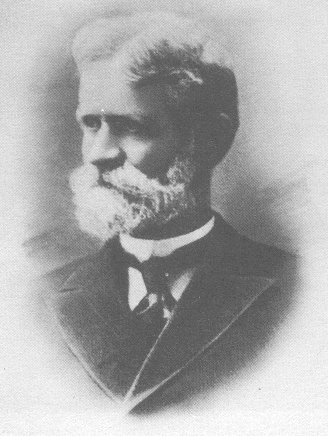
- Born: February 11, 1839; Penfield, New York, U.S.
- Died: May 26, 1902 (aged 63); St. Petersburg, Florida, U.S.
- Occupation: Inventor
- Spouse: Susan Strowger

Almon Brown Strowger (/ˈstroʊdʒər/; February 11, 1839 – May 26, 1902) was an American inventor for whom the Strowger switch, an electromechanical telephone exchange technology, is named.

== Early years ==
Strowger was born in Penfield, New York, near Rochester, the grandson of the second settler and first miller in Penfield. Little is known about his early life. It is said that if his mother gave her children a task, Strowger and his brothers would often try to devise a machine to do the task for them. He taught school in Penfield for a time.

In October 1861, he enlisted as a Musician in Company A, 8th New York Cavalry Regiment, to fight in the American Civil War. He was promoted to Sergeant and Chief Trumpeter of the regiment in February 1864, and ended the war as a Second Lieutenant. He was wounded in action at the Third Battle of Winchester in 1864, and discharged later that year.

After the Civil War, it appears he first became a country school teacher before he became an undertaker. He is variously attributed as living in El Dorado, Kansas, or Topeka, Kansas, and finally Kansas City, Missouri. It is not clear where his idea of an automatic telephone exchange was originally conceived, but his patent application identifies him as being a resident of Kansas City, Missouri, on March 10, 1891.

== Telephone exchange ==
A commonly told story holds that Strowger believed that his undertaking business was losing clients to a competitor whose wife was a local telephone operator and was preventing telephone calls from being routed to Strowger's business and re-routing them to her husband's business instead, following his discovery in the newspaper that a friend's funeral was being handled elsewhere. Motivated to remove the intermediary operator, he invented the first automatic telephone exchange in 1889; he received its patent in 1891. It is reported that he initially constructed a model of his invention from a round collar box and some straight pins.

== Finances ==
While Strowger may have come up with the idea, he was not alone in his endeavors and sought the assistance of his nephew William and others with a knowledge of electricity and money to realise his concepts. With this help the Strowger Automatic Telephone Exchange Company was formed and it installed and opened the first commercial exchange in (his then home town of) La Porte, Indiana, on November 3, 1892, with about 75 subscribers and capacity for 99. He married Susan A. (1846–1921) from Massachusetts in 1897 as his second wife. Strowger sold his patents to his associates in 1896 for $1,800 (about $59,000 in 2021) and sold his share in the Automatic Electric Company for $10,000 (about $330,000 in 2021) in 1898. His patents were subsequently sold to Bell Systems for $2.5 million in 1916 (about $63,000,000 in 2021).

The company's engineers continued development of Strowger's designs and submitted several patents in the names of its employees. It also underwent several name changes. Strowger himself seems to have not taken part in this further development. He subsequently moved to St. Petersburg, Florida. Strowger was a man of some wealth at his death and was reported as owning at least a city block of property.

== Death ==
Strowger died, aged 63, of an aneurysm after suffering from anemia, at St. Petersburg, Pinellas County, Florida; he was buried in Greenwood Cemetery the next day. His grave is marked with the traditional white headstone with an inscription that reads: "Lieut. A.B. Strowger, Co. A, 8 NY Cav."

He was survived by his widow Susan A. Strowger (1846–1921). After her death in Tampa, Florida, on April 14, 1921, her obituary appeared in the St. Petersburg Times, claiming she had additional "revolutionary" Strowger designs, but she had refused to make them public while she was alive because only others would profit from her husband's designs. She had claimed that her husband had only received $10,000 for his invention, when he should have received $1,000,000.

== Legacy ==
A bronze plaque, to commemorate his invention, was placed on his grave in 1945 by telephone company officials. Strowger was admitted to the hall of fame of the U.S. Independent Telephone Association (later the USTA) in 1965. Apart from his invention, his name has also been given to a locomotive and a company business award.

In 2003, the Verizon Foundation awarded $4500 to Pinellas Heritage, Inc. and the Pinellas Genealogy Society in Strowger's memory. The funds were used to develop a website to impart the history of the cemetery where Strowger is buried, and to restore two Civil War memorials. The Greenwood Cemetery project won an organization achievement award from the Florida Trust for Historic Preservation.

== Patents ==
- U.S. patent 0,447,918 Strowger switch "Automatic Telephone Exchange" (March 10, 1891)
- U.S. patent 0,486,909 Strowger patent for "Automatic Telephone or Other Electrical Exchange" (November 29, 1892)
- U.S. patent 0,591,201 Strowger, et al. patent for "Electrical Exchange" (October 5, 1897)

== See also ==
- Rotary dial – Device for sending telephone numbers
- Telephone exchange – Telecommunication system for establishing telephone calls

== Sources ==
- Katherine Wilcox Thompson, "Penfield's Past", 1960, pub. by the Town of Penfield, NY, pp 178–179
- Hill, R. B. (January 1953). "Early Work on Dial Telephone Systems" (PDF). Bell Laboratories Record. XXXI (1): 22–9.
- Hill, R. B. (March 1953). "The Early Years of the Strowger System" (PDF). Bell Laboratories Record. XXXI (3): 95–103.
- Bell Labs, Bell Laboratories Website
