= Vidéotron =

Canadian telecommunications company

- Formerly: Télécâble Vidéotron Limitée
- Type: Subsidiary
- Industry: Telecommunications
- Founded: 1964; 62 years ago
- Founder: André Chagnon
- Headquarters: 612, rue Saint-Jacques; Montreal, Quebec; H3C 4M8
- Key people: Pierre Karl Péladeau (President and CEO)
- Services: Cable television, Cable internet, Cable VoIP Telephony, Wireless communication
- Revenue: $3.735 billion CAD (2021)
- Number of employees: 6,500 (2022)
- Parent: Quebecor
- Subsidiaries: Freedom Mobile, Fizz Mobile
- Website: videotron.com/en

Vidéotron is a Canadian integrated telecommunications company founded in 1964. It is active in cable television, interactive multimedia development, video on demand, cable telephony, wireless communication and Internet access services. Owned by Quebecor, it primarily serves Quebec and the city of Ottawa, as well as the Francophone communities of New Brunswick and some parts of Eastern Ontario. Its principal competitors are Bell Canada and Telus Communications.

Vidéotron is the fourth-largest wireless carrier in Canada, with nearly 1,700,000 mobile subscribers as of Q2 2022.

== History ==
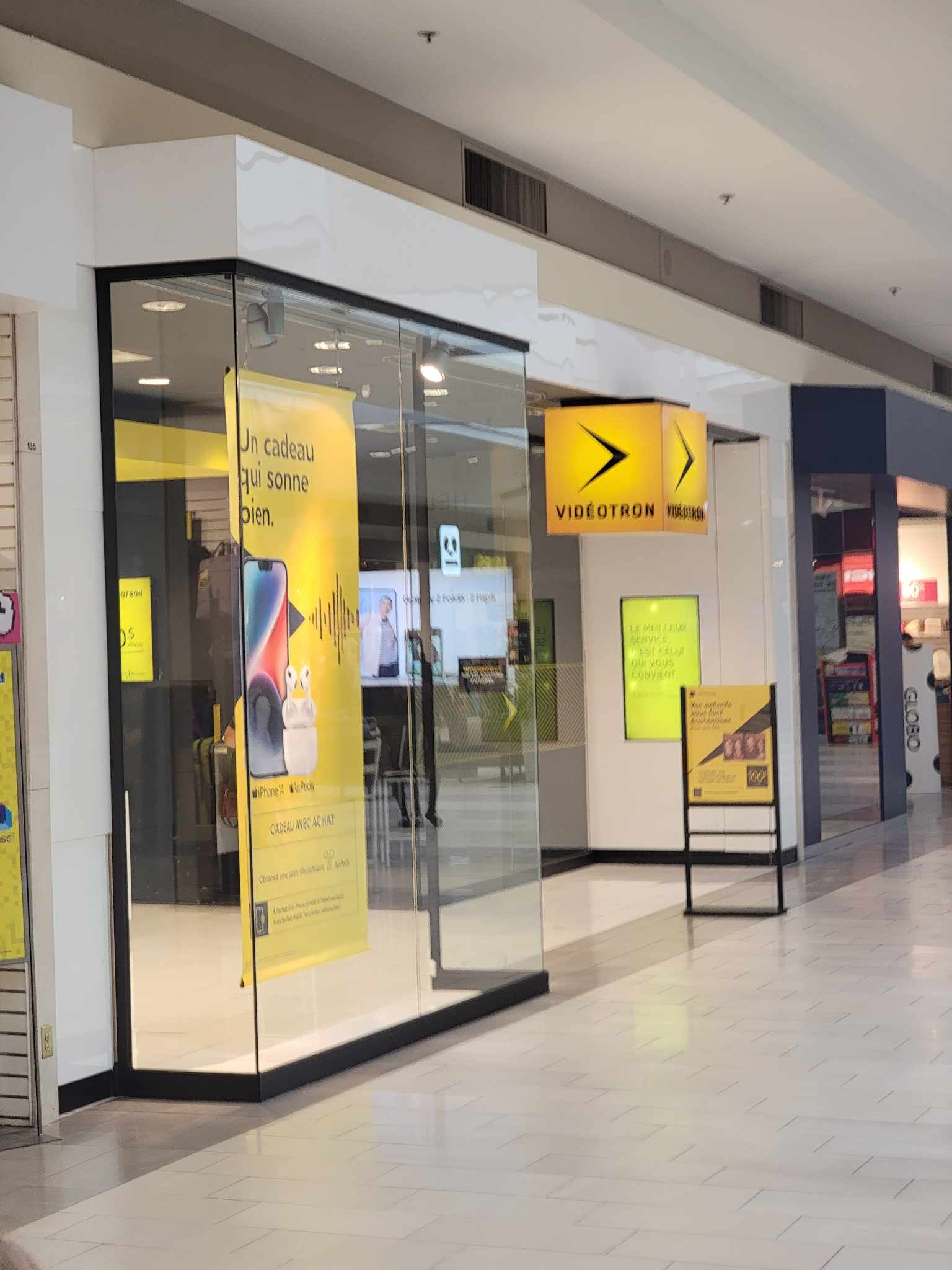
Videotron store at the Carrefour Angrignon mall in LaSalle

Logo in 1964

Vidéotron was established in 1964, under the name "Télécâble Vidéotron Ltée" as northern Montreal's first cable television network. It started with 66 subscribers. André Chagnon served as the company's founding president.

From 1966 to 1969, Vidéotron expanded by acquiring several cable networks in many regions of the province of Quebec.

In 1969, the company offered the first pay-per-view service under the name Sélecto-TV.

In 1974, a bi-directional network was created in Saint-Jérôme, one of the first in the world at the time.

By 1980, Vidéotron acquired Câblevision Nationale to become the largest teledistributor in Quebec. Vidéotron acquired Télé-Métropole in 1986, the largest private French-language television company in North America.

In 1989 the company opened the first video rental stores: Le SuperClub Vidéotron. Its first fibre optic network was created between the cities of Quebec and Montreal.

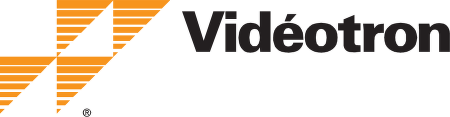
Logo from 1980s to 2001

On January 24, 1990, Vidéotron launched Vidéoway terminals in Quebec, the first interactive television (ITV) system in North America.

From 1995, the company entered the Internet era and acquired its own Internet portal, InfiniT.com.

In 1997, CF Cable TV, which operated primarily on the western end of the Island of Montreal, southern Laval and Northern Ontario, was acquired by Vidéotron, further expanding its base. The Northern Ontario division was later sold to Regional Cablesystems.

On March 29, 1999, the company launched digital television in Montreal.

Logo from 2001 to 2004

By the start of the 21st century, Rogers Communications struck an accord with the Chagnon family to purchase Vidéotron. However, citing cultural sovereignty concerns, the second-largest shareholder invoked its right to veto the purchase. Quebecor acquired Vidéotron instead, after months of legal proceedings. On May 23, 2001, the Canadian Radio-television and Telecommunications Commission (CRTC) approved the transfer of broadcasting licences from Vidéotron to Quebecor.

Video-on-demand and high-definition television became available in 2003.

Logo from 2004 to 2009

Vidéotron launched their wireless service in August 2006 and, two years later the company announced the launch of two new internet access services: Ultimate Speed Internet 30 and Ultimate Speed Internet 50 which deliver speeds of 30 Mbit/s and 50 Mbit/s respectively.

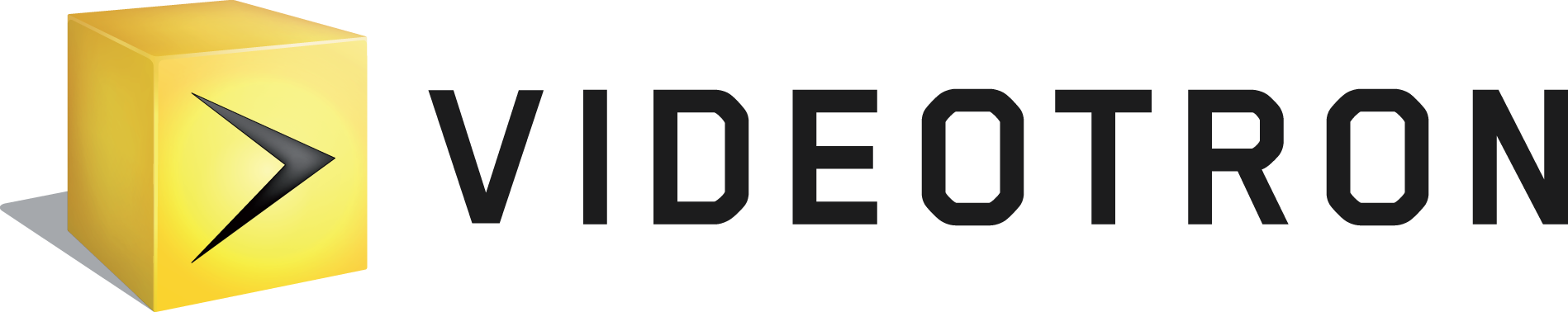
Logo from 2009 to 2012

In the spring of 2010, Vidéotron launched IllicoWeb, an online television and video-on-demand service. In September, it launched a 3G+ wireless service, with plans to offer a quadruple play service with its existing cable services.

Logo from 2012 to 2017

On December 30, 2017, assets from Vidéotron G.P. were transferred to Vidéotron Ltée, as the company underwent a corporate reorganization.

In September 2018, Vidéotron began beta testing for Fizz, a discount flanker brand on its network.

== Services ==
Vidéotron serves 1,830,400 cable television customers, including over 1,517,600 digital cable subscribers. Vidéotron also has more than 1,408,200 high-speed cable Internet subscribers, the most in Quebec. As of September 2013, the company had activated 478,000 mobile phones, and was providing cable telephone service to nearly 1,281,200 customers. Vidéotron's cable services are available in the greater areas of Montreal, Quebec City, Gatineau, Sherbrooke, Trois-Rivières and Saguenay. Vidéotron also serves areas in eastern Ontario, such as Rockland and the surrounding municipality of Clarence-Rockland, as well as parts of New Brunswick near the Quebec border.

Vidéotron offers broadband and IPTV-based digital cable television under the Helix and Illico brands, which is based on Comcast's X1 platform and hardware. Helix serves as a successor to the company's existing Illico TV digital cable platform. Vidéotron's community channels are branded as MAtv. As of March 2026, Vidéotron no longer offers new subscriptions to its digital cable service.

The company offers a subscription video on-demand service known as Illico+ (formerly Club Illico). It has produced original series such as Escouade 99, Portrait-Robot, The Night Logan Woke Up (La nuit où Laurier Gaudreault s'est réveillé) and Mégantic.

Vidéotron cable services were once available in the United Kingdom, but were acquired and merged into Cable & Wireless plc along with Bell Cablemedia and NYNEX Corporation in 1997. The company also used to operate in Africa and the United States. One of its previous subsidiaries – Videotron Telecom (not to be confused with Videotron Mobile) – was financed by the Carlyle Group.

Vidéotron has provided telecommunication services to business and governments since the integration of Vidéotron Télécom into Vidéotron Ltée. The services include dark fibre, SONET, ATM, and Ethernet links as well as video circuits used by various Quebec television networks.

=== Cable telephone service ===
On July 29, 2004, Vidéotron announced plans to launch a telephone service using VoIP technology by the first half of 2005. Vidéotron launched its cable phone service in late 2004 to compete with Bell Canada and Telus. Deployment of this service started on Montreal's South Shore. By press release on January 24, 2005, Vidéotron announced that 300,000 customers on Montreal's South Shore had access to this service and that deployment would continue all over Quebec throughout 2005. Vidéotron also announced that about 2,500 customers had already subscribed to this service, following a trial conducted in the fall of 2004.

Vidéotron was also the first cable provider in Canada to launch a cable phone service.

=== Mobile network ===
In July 2008, Videotron ltée and Quebecor acquired spectrum licences for advanced wireless services from an Industry Canada auction at a total cost of $554,559,000. The licences cover Quebec for an average of 40 MHz spectrum, Toronto with 10 MHz and south-east Ontario. The network was launched on September 9, 2010. Infrastructure work for a pre-4G HSPA+ wireless network was done over the span of three years, Videotron now having its own cellular communications resources.

Vidéotron was the only provider in Canada that sold the short-lived Garmin Nuvifone A50 smartphone.

In 2013, Rogers and Vidéotron struck a 20-year deal, enabling Vidéotron to share its network with Rogers Wireless. This network sharing agreement enabled Vidéotron to deploy LTE on its network in Quebec in 2014, in partnership with Rogers. The agreement also enabled Vidéotron customers to use the Rogers Wireless network as a Vidéotron partner network in order to allow texts to be sent or received, calls to be made and for data to be used across Canada. In 2016, Vidéotron revamped its plans, allowing customers to make unlimited calls, send and receive texts and use data in the United States as well, due to partnerships with US carriers.

Vidéotron began beta testing in 2018 for a new mid-range mobile flanker brand, Fizz Mobile, in Quebec and in Ottawa. In 2023, as an aspect of Rogers Communications' acquisition of Shaw Communications, parent company Quebecor acquired Shaw-owned Freedom Mobile.

=== Technical support ===
The major centres are located in Montreal, Longueuil, Quebec City, Gatineau, Joliette, Saguenay and St-Hubert. Vidéotron also has outsourced customer service centres that include Utopia, Gexel Telecom and Atelka. In 2007, Videotron formed a partnership with Xceed Contact Centre to outsource some of the call centres to Egypt.

== Controversy ==
=== High-Speed Extreme Internet ===
On August 14, 2007, Videotron announced starting October 1 they would impose a 100-gigabyte-per-month download/upload limit with a penalty of $1.50 per extra gigabyte to their previously unrestricted High-Speed Extreme Internet service, even to existing subscribers. This decision created outrage among its Internet users, and led to a class action suit against Videotron by consumer advocacy group Union des Consommateurs. In September 2013, the court authorized the suit to proceed. Ultimately the Quebec Superior Court rendered a $1.2 million judgment in favour of the plaintiffs.

== See also ==
- List of Canadian mobile phone companies
- List of internet service providers in Canada
