= Cityfone =

Canadian cellular network service reseller

Cityfone Telecommunications Inc.
- Type: Cellular network reseller
- Industry: Wireless Services
- Founded: 1997; 29 years ago
- Defunct: December 31, 2024
- Fate: Merged into Rogers Wireless
- Headquarters: Burnaby, British Columbia
- Products: Postpaid cellular service
- Parent: Rogers Communications
- Website: cityfone.net

Cityfone Telecommunications Inc. was a Canadian cellular network service reseller owned by Rogers Communications, who acquired it in 2010 for CAD$26 million. It provides services through Rogers Wireless. It was founded in 1997 by Dejan Mirkovic, Donald Roth, and Mark Reid.

It operates under the Cityfone, Primus Wireless, Zoomer Wireless, and, most recently, SimplyConnect brand names. It only offers postpaid plans under each.

As of November 15, 2023, the company stopped accepting new activations and began transitioning customers over to Rogers Wireless. On December 31, 2024, Rogers Wireless ended support for all Cityfone companies, including SimplyConnect and Zoomer Wireless.

== Network ==
Cityfone was owned by Rogers and uses the Rogers Wireless' network. Like Rogers and Fido, they supported LTE, including Voice over LTE.

== Products ==
Cityfone carried feature phones and low-end smartphones.

== Partners ==
- Bank of Montreal
- Royal Bank of Canada
- Primus Canada
- Scotiabank
- Sears Canada (SearsConnect)
- ZoomerMedia

== See also ==
- List of Canadian mobile phone companies
