= Cloudli =

Cloudli Communications
- Formerly: babyTEL
- Type: Private
- Industry: Telecommunications
- Founded: May 2004
- Headquarters: Montreal, Quebec, Canada
- Area served: Canada, United States
- Products: VoIP services
- Services: Residential and business VoIP
- Parent: CPS Capital (2020–present)

Cloudli, formerly babyTEL, is a Montreal-based VoIP service provider, providing both residential and commercial VoIP access throughout the United States and Canada.

== History ==
First launched in May 2004 as a Canada-only operator, babyTEL provided VoIP services in Canada and later expanded into the United States. In February 2007, babyTEL launched service in the U.S. market. After being acquired by CPS Capital in November 2020, in January 2021 babyTEL was rebranded as Cloudli

== Products and services ==
One of Cloudli's features is its single-line/multiple location capability, giving users the ability to route a single number to two or more phones that can be separated by a few feet or by thousands of miles. Cloudli is also a pioneer in social-networked VoIP having launched an early integrated telephone service for the Facebook platform called Telephone.

== See also ==
- Voice over Internet Protocol
