= List of United States telephone companies =

This is a list of United States telephone companies serving traditional landline telephone exchanges. It does not include VoIP service providers, or cellular mobile phone providers.

== Regional Bell Operating Companies ==
The seven Regional Bell Operating Companies (RBOCs) were created as the result of the break-up of the Bell System in 1984. After numerous mergers, divestments, and rebrandings since the break-up, these are the current successor RBOCs:

- AT&T serves pre-breakup Bell exchanges in Alabama, Arkansas, California, Florida, Georgia, Illinois, Indiana, Kansas, Kentucky, Louisiana, Michigan, Mississippi, Missouri, Nevada, North Carolina, Ohio, Oklahoma, South Carolina, Tennessee, Texas, and Wisconsin.
- Verizon serves former Bell system exchanges in Connecticut, Delaware, District of Columbia, Maryland, Massachusetts, New Jersey, New York, Pennsylvania, Rhode Island, Virginia, and West Virginia.
- Lumen Technologies includes former Bell System exchanges in Arizona, Colorado, Idaho, Iowa, Minnesota, Montana, Nebraska, New Mexico, North Dakota, Oregon, South Dakota, Utah, Washington, and Wyoming.
- Fidium Fiber operates former Bell exchanges in Maine, New Hampshire, and Vermont which it acquired from FairPoint Communications, which had acquired them from Verizon.

Altafiber, formerly known as Cincinnati Bell, serves ex-Bell exchanges in the Cincinnati metropolitan area. It was not transferred to an RBOC in the Bell System breakup because the original AT&T held only a minority stake in the company.

=== Other local exchange carrier areas ===
RBOCs that, through mergers and acquisitions, also serve as local exchange carriers in areas that were not covered by the Bell System include:

- Verizon, in addition to the ex-Bell exchanges it has retained, serves former GTE areas in Pennsylvania and Virginia, and areas in 27 other states, including parts of Alabama, Arizona, California, Florida, Georgia, Illinois, Indiana, Iowa, Michigan, Minnesota, Mississippi, Nebraska, Nevada, New Mexico, New York, North Carolina, Ohio, Pennsylvania, South Carolina, Tennessee, Texas, Utah, and Wisconsin which were acquired via their purchase of Frontier Communications, many of which were former GTE areas Frontier had previously bought from Verizon.
- Lumen Technologies, in addition to the ex-Bell exchanges in 14 states gained from its acquisition of Qwest, serves other non-ex-Bell local exchanges in those states, as well as some in Florida and the Las Vegas metropolitan area in Nevada.
- Fidium Fiber, in addition to its ex-Bell exchanges in Northern New England, also serves rural areas in 22 states.
- Altafiber, in addition to its ex-Bell exchanges in the Cincinnati area, operates exchanges in Hawaii via its ownership of Hawaiian Telcom.

== Non-Bell exchange carriers ==
- Brightspeed was formed in 2022 when Lumen sold its landline operations in 20 states outside its core area (and Florida).
- Windstream, founded in 2006 with the spinoff of Alltel's wireline division and simultaneous merger with Valor Telecom, serves mainly rural areas in 29 states.
- Telephone and Data Systems serves mainly rural areas in parts of 36 states.
- Claro Puerto Rico, which serves every exchange in Puerto Rico, has been owned by the international telecommunications giant América Móvil since 2007.
- Ziply Fiber serves ex-GTE areas in Idaho, Washington, Oregon and Montana acquired from Frontier.

Many other individual communities or smaller regions are also served by non-RBOC companies.

== See also ==
- Lists of public utilities
- List of Canadian telephone companies
