= NorthernTel =

NorthernTel LP
- Type: Subsidiary
- Industry: Communications Services
- Founded: 1905
- Headquarters: Temiskaming Shores, Ontario, Canada
- Owner: BCE Inc.
- Number of employees: 250
- Parent: BCE
- Website: northerntel.ca

NorthernTel LP (formerly Northern Telephone Limited or NTL) is a telephone company in Ontario, Canada.

NorthernTel began in April 1905 in New Liskeard, Ontario, as the Temiskaming Telephone Company. It grew by buying other regional telephone providers and became the Northern Telephone Company Ltd. in 1928. Over the years, the company expanded into Northwestern Ontario and Northwestern Quebec. These assets were later sold to Bell Canada (1969) and Télébec (1976), respectively.

The company changed its name to NorthernTel in 2003. Today, NorthernTel is the local telephone provider in several Northeastern Ontario communities, notably Timmins.

NorthernTel was acquired by Bell Aliant on January 30, 2007, but since 2016 it has been considered a subsidiary of BCE as Bell Aliant's operations were consolidated into those of Bell Canada. Both divisions carry the same FibreOP channel listings.

NorthernTel has a service area of 83,000 square kilometres.
