= Local telephone service =

Local telephone service is the provision of telecommunications networks and services within a limited geographic region.

Traditionally, local telephone service was provided by small companies based in given cities and towns as opposed to larger, national or international companies. Telephone calls outside of the local area provided for by these companies were patched through long-distance networks that were, until de-regulation, operation mainly by AT&T. Some providers of local services were regional Bell operating companies, but not all local telephone companies were a regional Bell operating company or tied to one at the local level, especially after de-regulation of 1996. After de-regulation, these regional Bell operating companies continued providing the same technical services despite being under a different type of corporate structure.

Many communities in the United States had local telephone companies and in rural areas, up until around the early 1980s (perhaps later in some cases) party lines were commonplace. The local telephone company was responsible for providing equipment and services to their customers in most cases although over time, as technology changed, so did the nature of the technical services thus provided.

At one time telephones were leased from the local phone company rather than sold outright to customers. Many customers had rotary telephones that were leased prior to the 1980s. Despite the fact that the leasing system was not intended to promote this situation, customers in some cases ended up paying ten times the worth of their phones over the course of decades-long leases. Local telephone companies also provided PBX (Private Branch Exchange) services for local businesses that needed these switchboard and internal telecommunications services. Local telephone companies more recently become involved in providing Internet by DSL and dial-up services.

Local telephone wires terminate at the central office (telephone exchange), a structure containing the hardware needed to switch calls among local lines and long-distance networks. Thus, when a call was placed by a customer outside the local calling area, the central office would switch the call to the respective long-distance network. As technology advanced, central offices offered more services and their technical abilities improved. Services such as Caller ID, call return call-waiting, three-way calling, and voice-mail were first offered via central office-based technology although later PBXs also provided them. The role of the local phone company includes serving a given community and interfacing with the large long-distance carriers. Prior to the advent of cell phones, most phone calls were made via landlines and local companies were thereby involved in some capacity in this communication. Deregulation and especially cell phones have reduced the need for local telephone services while Digital subscriber line Internet service and other services give local companies new roles in the telecommunications industry.

== See also ==
- Access network
- Local exchange carrier
- Competitive Local Exchange Carrier (CLEC)
- Basic exchange telecommunications radio service
- Local access and transport area
- Regional Bell operating company
- Telephone
- Telephone exchange
