= Theodore Gary & Company =

Theodore Gary & Company was a 20th-century independent telephone firm in the United States. Among its subsidiaries was the Associated Telephone and Telegraph Company, which controlled telephone companies in Latin America and telephone manufacturing interests in Europe in the 1920s and 1930s. In that capacity, Associated, formed in 1925, was the only other serious U.S. rival of International Telephone and Telegraph in Europe before World War II. Associated also exercised influence over the telephone networks in the Dominican Republic and Columbia. In 1930 it formed a new subsidiary, the General Telephone and Electric Corporation, with Transamerica Corporation and British investors, to strengthen overseas manufacturing and operations in competition with ITT. This was headed by Theodore Gary's son, Hunter Larrabee Gary. It would ultimately merge into the General Telephone Corp. (later known as GTE) in 1955.
