= Strowger switch =

Electromechanical telephone switch

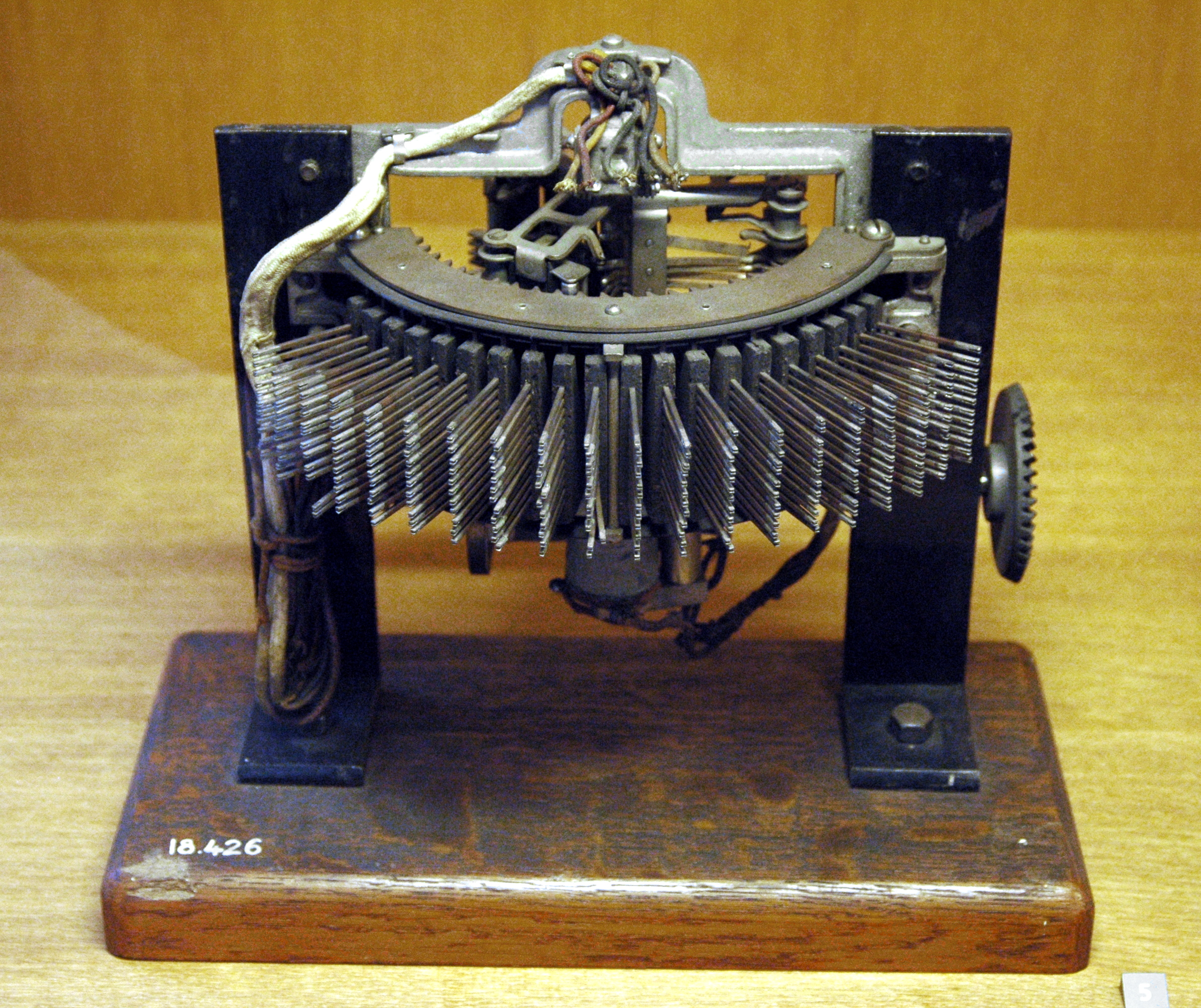
Western Electric 7A Rotary, friction drive (Bird-cage), No. 7001 Line Finder. Note the driven bevel gear on the right-hand side; this type has a steady rotary motion and does not employ an electromagnet for stepping.

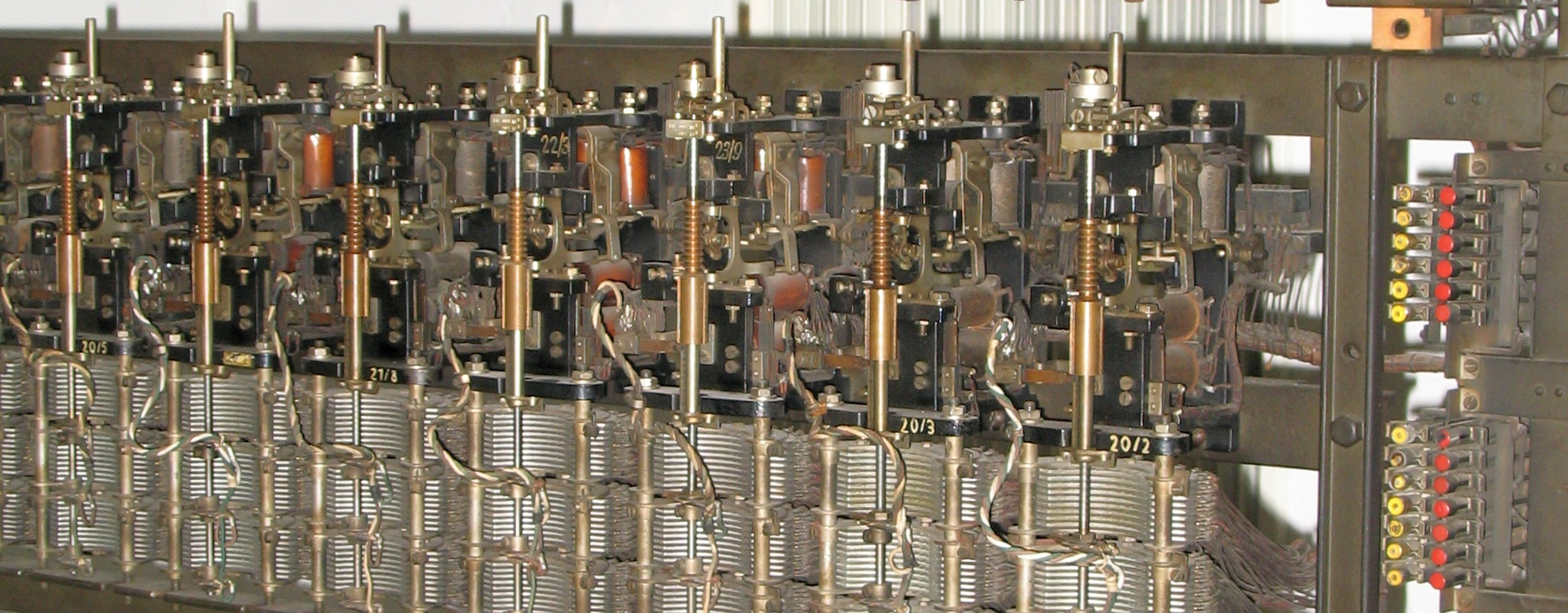
Bank of two-motion switches

The Strowger switch is the first commercially successful electromechanical stepping switch telephone exchange system. It was developed by the Strowger Automatic Telephone Exchange Company founded in 1891 by Almon Brown Strowger. Based on its mechanical characteristics, it is also known as a step-by-step (SXS) switch.

== History ==
Strowger, an undertaker, was motivated to invent an automatic telephone exchange after becoming convinced that the manual telephone exchange operators were deliberately interfering with his calls, leading to loss of business. According to the local Bell Telephone Company manager Herman Ritterhoff, Strowger swore to "get even" with the telephone operators and "put every last one of them out of a job." Ritterhoff claimed in 1913 that the real cause of Strowger's difficulties was a metal sign hung on his wall over his telephone, causing an intermittent short circuit when blown by the wind.

Strowger conceived his invention in 1888, and was awarded a patent for an automatic telephone exchange in 1891. The initial model was made from a round collar box and some straight pins.

While Almon Strowger devised the initial concept, he was not alone in his endeavors and sought the assistance of his brother Arnold, nephew William, and others with a knowledge of electricity and financing to realize the concept. The Strowger Automatic Telephone Exchange Company was founded in 1891. In the original design patent, four keys were added near the telephone, one each for thousands, hundreds, tens and units, with each key having an additional wire connection to the central exchange. Each key had to be tapped the correct number of times to step the switch and make the desired connection. To connect to number 1256, the user would press the first key once, the second key twice, the third key five times and the final key six times.

The company installed and opened the first commercial exchange in his then-home town of La Porte, Indiana on November 3, 1892. The exchange had around 75 subscribers. The installation followed the original patented design, with four keys and four additional line wires connected to the exchange, but not all of the keys were used.

Early advertising called the new invention the "girl-less, cuss-less, out-of-order-less, wait-less telephone".

In 1896 the company patented a finger-wheel dial as an improvement to the existing four-key design.

The Strowger Automatic Telephone Exchange Company became the Automatic Electric Company, which Strowger was involved in founding, although Strowger himself seems not to have been involved in further developments. The Strowger patents were exclusively licensed to the Automatic Electric Company. Strowger sold his patents in 1896 for US$1,800 (equivalent to $57,000 in 2023) and sold his share in Automatic Electric in 1898 for $10,000 (equivalent to $310,000 in 2023). His patents subsequently sold for $2,500,000 (equivalent to $48,000,000 in 2023) in 1916. Company engineers continued development of the Strowger designs and submitted several patents in the names of its employees.

Stowger systems were widespread through most of the 20th century, being gradually relegated to small community service, and replaced by new technology more cost-effective for large-city installations, such as the Panel switch in the United States, and the Rotary system outside the US, and by the late 1930s by the crossbar switch, and the electronic switching systems starting in the 1960s.

=== British deployment ===
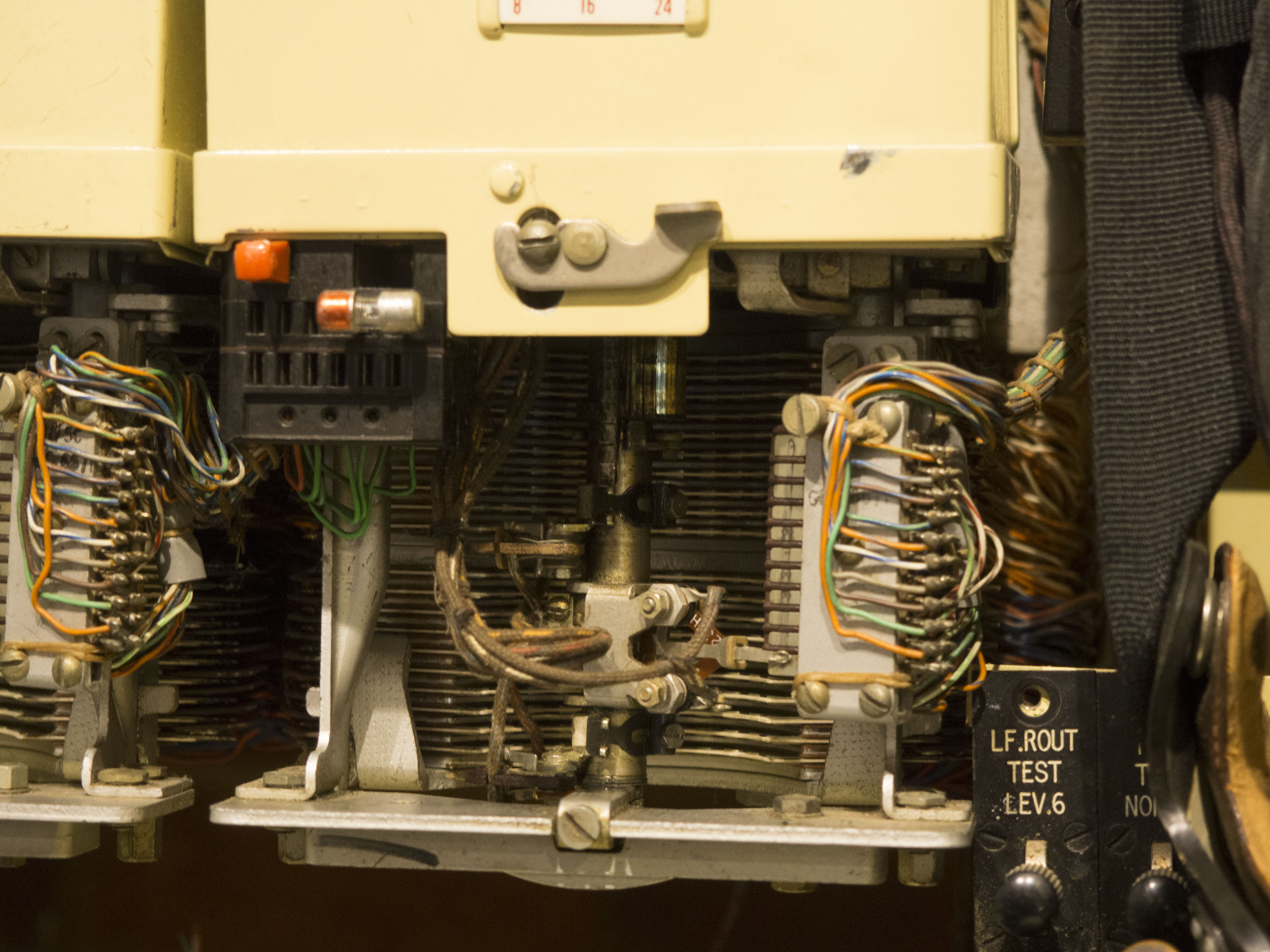
British SXS two-motion contact bank

From 1912, the British General Post Office, which also operated the British telephone system, installed several automatic telephone exchanges from several vendors in trials at Darlington on 10 October 1914 and Dudley on 9 September 1916 (rotary system), Fleetwood (relay exchange from Sweden), Grimsby (Siemens), Hereford (Lorimer) and Leeds (Strowger). The GPO selected the Strowger switches for small and medium-sized cities and towns. The selection of switching systems for London and other large cities was not decided until the 1920s, when the Director telephone system was adopted. The Director systems used SXS switches for destination routing and number translation facilities similar to the register used in common-control exchanges. Using similar equipment as in the rest of the network was deemed beneficial and the equipment could be manufactured in Britain.

== Patent details ==
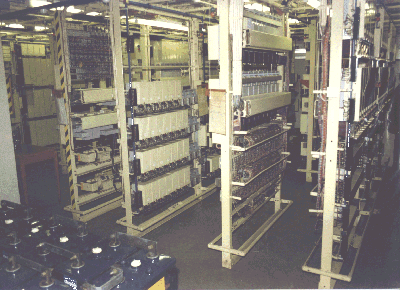
British Strowger exchange, BPO 2000-type equipment

Strowger's patent specifies dialing equipment at the customer location and the switching equipment at the central office.

The telegraph keys or telephone dial creates trains of on-off current pulses corresponding to the digits 1–9, and 0 (which sends 10 pulses). This equipment originally consisted of two telegraph keys engaged by knife switches, and evolved into the rotary dial telephone.

The central office switching equipment has a two-motion stepping switch. A contact arm is moved up to select one of ten rows of contacts, and then rotated clockwise to select one of ten contacts in that row, a total of 100 choices. The stepping motion is controlled by the current pulses coming from the originating customer's telegraph keys, and later from the rotary dial.

=== Two-motion mechanism ===
The Strowger switch has three banks of contacts. Toward the upper end of each shaft are two ratchets. The upper one has ten grooves, and raises the shaft. The lower one has long vertical teeth (on the other side, hidden).

The original Strowger switch used two telegraph-type keys on a telephone set for dialing. The keys are tapped to step the switch in two stages, a vertical (V) and a rotating (R) stage, each requiring a separate electrical circuit between exchange and telephone set. The first set of incoming pulses (V) raises the armature of an electromagnet to move a shaft which selects the desired level of contacts, by engaging a pawl with the upper ratchet. Another pawl, pivoting on the frame, holds the shaft at that height as it rotates (R). The second set of pulses, from the second key, operates another electromagnet. Its pawl engages the (hidden) vertical teeth in the lower ratchet to rotate the shaft to the required position. It is kept there against spring tension by a pawl pivoted on the frame. When the switch returns to its home position, typically when a call is complete, a release magnet disengages the pawls that hold the shaft in position. An interlock ensures that the spring on the shaft rotates it to angular home position before it drops to its home position by gravity.

== Development ==
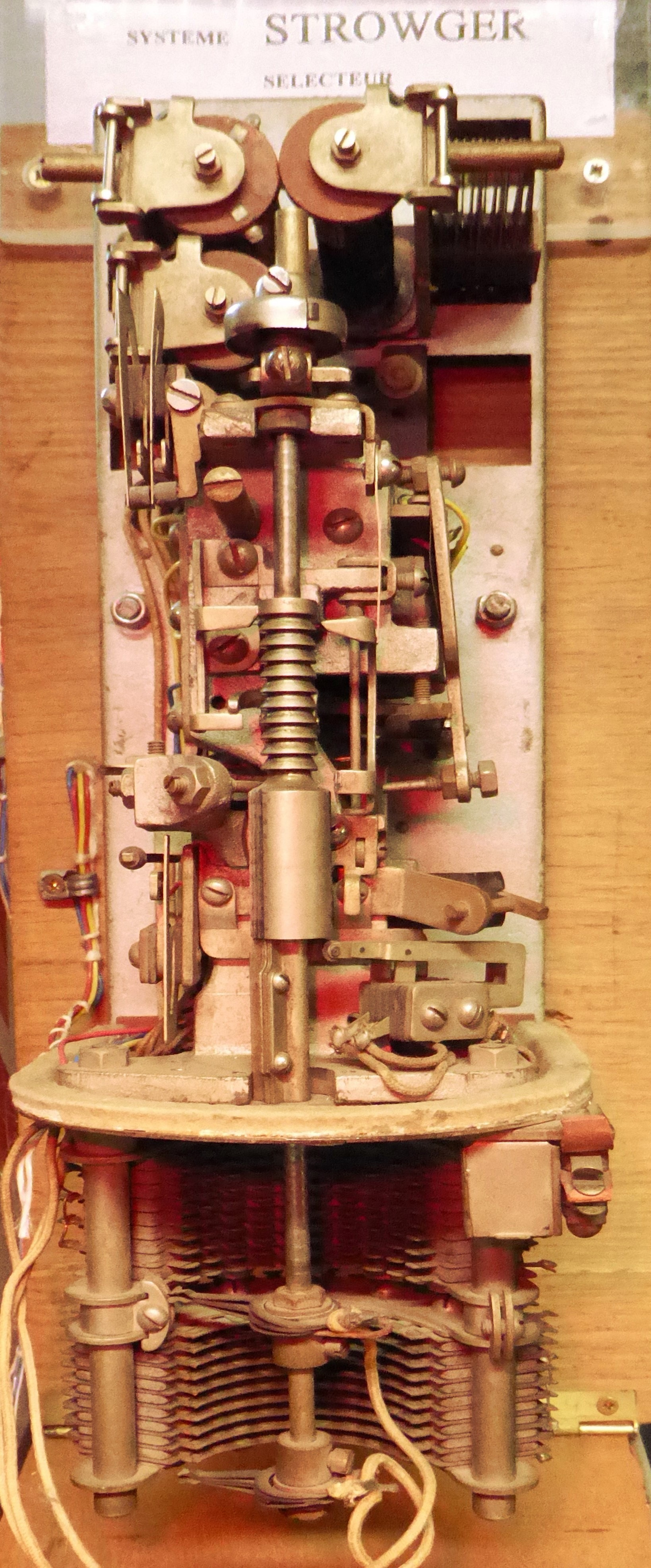
Télégraphie, Systeme Strowger

The commercial version of the Strowger switch, as developed by the Strowger Automatic Telephone Exchange Company, used a rotary dial for signalling to the exchange. The original final selector (connector) switch which connected to 100 customers was supplemented by preceding group selector stages, as the "cascading" enabled connection to many more customers, and to customers at other exchanges. Another requirement for commercial systems was a circuit to detect a busy connection (line) and return a busy signal to the calling subscriber.

Instead of dedicating an expensive first-stage selector switch to each customer as in the first exchange, the customer was given access to the first-stage switch of a telephone network, often by a line-finder which searches "backward" for the calling line; so requiring only a few relays (in most cases two, a Line, and a Cut-off relay), for the equipment required for each customer line.

Later Strowger (SXS) exchanges often use a subscriber uniselector as part of the line equipment individual to each line, which searches "forward" for a first selector. This is more economical for higher calling-rate domestic or business customers, and has the advantage that access to additional switches can readily be added if the traffic increases (the number of linefinders serving a group is limited by the wiring multiple installed). Hence exchanges with subscriber uniselectors were usually used at British exchanges with a high proportion of business customers, e.g. director exchanges, or in New Zealand where the provision of local free calling meant that residential customers had a relatively high calling rate.

The fundamental modularity of the system combined with its step-by-step (hence the alternative name) selection process and an almost unlimited potential for expansion gives the Strowger system its technical advantage. Previous systems had all been designed for a fixed number of subscribers to be switched directly to each other in a mesh arrangement. This became quadratically more complex as each new customer was added, as each new customer needed a switch to connect to every other customer. In modern terminology, the previous systems were not scalable.

Strowger switch in use
The sound of a step-by-step call reaching a busy circuit.
