= Dryden Municipal Telephone Service =

Dryden Municipal Telephone System
- Type: Division
- Industry: Telecommunication
- Founded: 1912
- Headquarters: Dryden, Northern Ontario, Canada
- Products: High Speed Internet; Landline Telephone
- Owner: BCE Inc.
- Number of employees: 26
- Parent: BCE Inc.
- Website: www.dmts.biz

Dryden Municipal Telephone System (DMTS) is a formerly-municipally owned telephone company in Dryden, Ontario, Canada, offering local residential and business land line service within Dryden, long-distance service to Dryden and surrounding areas.

DMTS is also the largest internet service provider in the region, providing DSL, Dial-up, and operating the largest high-speed wireless internet network in Northwestern Ontario providing coverage to more than 1000 square kilometers around Dryden. DMTS also has a partnership with Xplornet for satellite internet service.

Bell Aliant completed its purchase of DMTS on January 1, 2013. Bell Aliant plans on continuing to use the DMTS brand name. Since 2016 it has been considered a subsidiary of BCE as Bell Aliant's operations were consolidated into those of Bell Canada.

== Dryden Mobility ==
Dryden Mobility was the cellular division of DMTS, with three CDMA cell sites operating in the 800 MHz band, covering the city and approximately 60 kilometers of the Trans Canada Highway. In 2009 Dryden Mobility began conversion to a GSM network in the 850 MHz band intended to cover a greater area than that covered by their CDMA network, from Kenora in the west, to Sioux Lookout to the north, east to Hearst, and south to Sault Ste. Marie.

Dryden Mobility operated as an independent wireless carrier, though roaming agreements were in place with Rogers Wireless.

In November 2012, Tbaytel purchased DMTS's cell phone subscriber base. DMTS's cell phone towers were shut down by December 21, 2012. Not all phones on DMTS's network were compatible with the Tbaytel cellular network.
