= Execulink Telecom =

Canadian telecommunications company

Execulink Telecom, Inc.
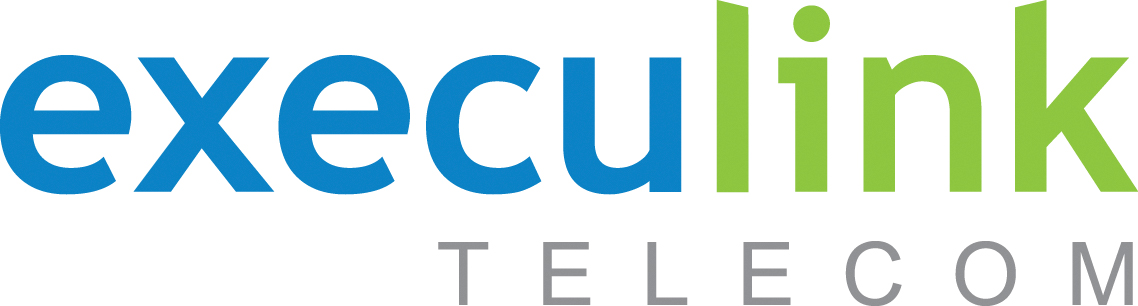
- Type: Privately held
- Industry: Telecommunications
- Founded: 1904
- Headquarters: Woodstock, Ontario, Canada
- Key people: Keith Stevens, Chairman; Ian Stevens, CEO
- Products: Landline and mobile telephony, Internet services, digital television, cable TV
- Parent: None
- Website: www.execulink.ca

Execulink Telecom Inc. is a Canadian telecommunications company headquartered in Woodstock, Ontario. Execulink Telecom was founded in 1904 as The Burgessville Telephone Company. After a number of mergers and renamings, Execulink is now one of the largest telecommunications providers in Ontario. Execulink provides telecommunications services including data, internet, television, mobility and advanced voice features. These services are now available to all levels of industry, including 50,000 business, enterprise, government, and residential customers.

== Early history ==
The Burgessville Telephone Company was founded in 1904 by Dr. Service, a local medical practitioner. The first line connected the doctor's office to Wm. Kirkpatrick's general store in Holbrook, two miles down the road. Prior to this, there was only one phone in Burgessville – a Bell long-distance outlet. The doctor believed that a local system would be of great benefit to the community, so he began circulating the idea among his neighbours. Initially, the idea was greeted with less than overwhelming approval. In spite of these doubts, a small group of enthusiasts offered to help him get started; one man donated poles from his wood lot, another volunteered to cut and haul them to the village, and others helped dig post-holes and string wire.

The initial construction was organized by Thomas Orum. From Kirkpatrick's in Holbrook it connected a line to the New Lawson Cheese Factory, another two miles west of Holbrook. With the line up and running, the doctor was literally swamped with requests for this new and exciting service. All that was necessary to be connected was to build a personal spur-line to connect to the original circuit and purchase a phone. "The farmers quite often would dig the holes and even furnish the poles if they had them, so it did not cost much to build a line." The first central switchboard was installed with six lines in 1905 in Burgessville. In a short time 200 phones were in operation. The decision was made to incorporate a limited company. Those with a phone were given stock in the company and agreed to pay eight dollars a year for maintenance of the system.

Rivalry among the independent companies, Bell and even between themselves was intense, often resulting in agitation for government ownership of the telephone business. While a 1905 parliamentary committee failed to produce any recommendations, the ensuing publicity did change Bell's attitude to some degree. Instead of a reluctance to connect with the independents, Bell began encouraging and completing toll traffic agreements with them. In 1910 the Telephone Act brought all independent systems under regulation of the Ontario Railway and Municipal Board.

As the Burgessville business grew, so did the need for larger premises. So in 1907 the company bought the Temperance Hall, located 300 yards east of Burgessville's main concern. The building was moved just south of the Burgess residence and was used for an office, switchboard room and also included living quarters for the lineman while the back room was used as a storage and supply room.

In 1923 residents of the area signed a petition, requesting the Township Council establish a municipal telephone system as a public utility. That signaled the transformation of the Burgessville Telephone Company (with its 660 subscribers) into the North Norwich Municipal Telephone System.

== North Norwich Municipal Telephone System ==
The 1923 petition heralded a new era in local communications. A debenture issue was sold to finance the $25,000 price paid to the Burgessville Company and its customers. Municipal systems like North Norwich were formed so the capital to finance increasingly sophisticated equipment could be raised by debentures, with each subscriber paying a portion of this levy and operating costs. The municipality owned the system in trust.

The 1930s saw many troubles for North Norwich. The Great Depression took a toll on the telephone company as it did with many other businesses and individuals. Unpaid accounts and the constant need to repair wires and poles led to financial worries. Then on January 1, 1932, the region found itself at the mercy of a natural foe - a massive ice storm. While the battered economy resulted in lost wages and a drop in customers and that icy winter's day in 1932 put subscribers through considerable hardships, the commissioners apparently could see the silver lining through the dark clouds. Reconstruction was the order of the day and before long the secretary-treasurer was reporting that the company financial situation was on the mend.

== Thedford ==
Bell Telephone provided the first telephone service in the area including a small switchboard with 20 drops. Additional lines extended into Port Franks and along the sixth concession to Geo. Laird. A local telephone company serving a territory including Thedford, Arkona, Bosanquet, Warwick, McGillivary, West Williams and Adelaide Townships was started in 1908. Among its founders were Thomas Moloy, and Dr. Alfred James Grant, secretary, and a number of other businessmen who decided that a communications system was needed. Their first step was a trek to make inquiries in the nearby town of Forest about the formation of a company between the two towns. Although the request was refused, this select group set about forming their own company - called the Thedford, Arkona and East Lambton Telephone Company.

The company saw quick growth in the next few years. On November 27, 1909, an agreement was signed with J. Geo. Brown for a pay station to be installed in their store for the general public. Also that year, on March 18, the People's Telephone Company of Forest is reported to have approached the Thedford group to connect a trunk line between the two companies at Jericho. This was achieved by the end of 1909. The following year a report to the Treasury Department of Ontario, dated May 10, 1910, showed the company had paid up capital stock amounting to $31,900.

The Thedford Company began negotiations with Bell and on August 14, 1914, the sale was completed.

At the January 26, 1916 annual meeting, it was reported that there had been an increase of 21 phones from the previous year. Shareholders and directors were credited with helping to construct new lines. That same year, Wm. Bell was hired on as the company's trouble man for one year.

During the 1917 annual meeting, the company's good fortunes were once at the fore. The capacity of all the main lines had increased to a degree where the company could accommodate new business. As a result, a line was constructed to Ipperwash Beach. It was a net growth of 11 telephones. A connection with the Parkhill Rural System had been established by trunk line; the reserve fund had increased to more than $1,000 and the usual six per cent dividend had been paid. All this had been accomplished without having to borrow any money.

In 1946 the company was sold to Dr. James A. Vance of Woodstock and Mr. E.T. Downs of Toronto. Shareholders in the original company were allowed to buy back shares in the new company which was renamed Hurontario Telephones Limited.

== Dr James A Vance ==
Dr. Vance's association with telecommunications began in 1934 when he was asked to be an administrator of an estate which had a substantial interest in the old Princeton & Drumbo Telephone Company Limited; a company that provided telephone service to the Princeton, Drumbo and Township of East Oxford areas. His first taste of that industry came right at the bottom of the Great Depression when most rural telephone companies were in a poor state of repair and finances.

In 1946 these five companies were amalgamated to form the Oxford Telephone Company Limited. This company, through the dedicated efforts and guidance of its directors, developed good quality of service to all its subscribers. In 1946, Case asked Vance to take an interest in his company - Thedford, Arkona and East Lambton Telephone Company. At the time there were about four hundred subscribers and the company served the Thedford, Port Franks and the Ipperwash Beach area. Dr. Vance purchased controlling interest in the company and, with the help of telephone associate Mr. E.T. Downs of Toronto, proceeded to re-organize the company and reconstruct the plant and equipment.

== Modernization ==
Throughout the 1950s, North Norwich continued to grow and change. The storm of February 1950 spelled trouble for the company, as the expenditures for that year had far exceeded revenues, and the reserve fund had also been used up. In auditor Donald McKee's financial report to the annual meeting it was revealed that five tons of wire had to be restored. In February 1951 subscribers (shareholders) met in Burgessville where they voted unanimously in favour of a recommendation that the North Norwich Township Council be asked to raise a $20,000 debenture to finance a construction scheme to begin in the spring.

By 1951 the Burgessville exchange had outgrown the old building so a new brick structure was built to house a new office, storage space and a workshop. A new switchboard was also installed when the building was complete. At this time the company also decided to upgrade the telephone system. It was to be changed gradually from a magneto to combination magneto and battery to totally common battery and dial system. Also included in the new building was an office, storage space and garage area for one truck. To accomplish the changes, the rates of subscribers connected with the Burgessville central were to be increased by $4.50 a year. Those served by the Bell central in Norwich, who had had a previous raise in rates, were to be increased another $3.50 a year.

During the early 1960s Bell had converted the Woodstock and Norwich exchanges to dial operation. As a result, North Norwich Municipal Telephones converted its phones to dial that switched into those two centres. In 1967 the Burgessville Exchange was cut over to dial and necessary improvements had been made to the service station lines at Woodstock and Norwich at a cost of $250,000. The Ontario Telephone Service Commission assisted the systems staff to plan the modernization program and loaned out one of its field engineers, Martin Prickaerts, during the time plant reconstruction was being carried out. He supervised the program and coordinated the work of the systems staff with that of outside contractors hired to complete certain phases of the program.

== The 1970s ==
In the early 1970s, the commissioners decided to rebuild the outside equipment with underground cable, a type of construction considered to be much more efficient than the old open-wire method. The program was proceeding according to plan until a tornado struck on August 7, 1979. A tornado cut a path of destruction through the area served by the telephone system. More than 80 homes were destroyed and outside equipment including lines were completely demolished. More than 10 miles of lines had to be rebuilt in the wake of the devastation. Yet, much like the ice storm of 1932, the community-at-large forged ahead through hard work and perseverance. What could have been a disastrous conclusion to more than seven decades of technological triumph turned out to be a defining moment in the company's history on several levels - a snapshot in time that captured the region and its people at their very best.

The company immediately hired additional help and with a lot of hard work and overtime, the outside equipment and installation of phones was completed by August 29, a mere 22 days after the tornado. All reconstructed cables were buried underground, continuing with the original rebuilding plan. However most of the new telephones themselves had to be installed temporarily until the new homes could be built.

To fund this massive project, Oxford MPP Harry Parrott, then Environment Minister, announced that an emergency grant of $100,000 had been awarded to the North Norwich Telephone System "to get back into business." The municipally owned company's predicament was described as an extraordinary situation and, with that in mind, the grant request was promptly recommended.

== The 1980s ==
On Feb. 18, 1981 an audio change for long-distance calls was implemented. The new automatic number identification eliminated the familiar "Your number please" with the automatic notation of the number. It affected all one and two-party customers in Burgessville only. Company general manager Ardyth Williams said the move to the automatic number identification system was necessary to keep up with the areas around the North Norwich system. It also resulted in some pay back for the independent company because it received money from Bell Canada for each long-distance call completed in this manner.

Commissioners from the North Norwich Municipal Telephone system presented a $900,000 expansion plan to Norwich Township council. Mr. Buckrell said the company was at a "financial cross roads" and "something had to be done", although he said the company was "in good financial shape" the plans for expansion would require modernizing the equipment to make the service more efficient. A survey of phone users in the Burgesville area indicated that many favoured a one party line system. In order to provide this service it would be necessary to lay more cable over a five-year period. "People want privacy and they’re willing to pay for it," said Barry Smith, a commission of the phone system.

== Thedford modernization ==
When Vance and Downs purchased controlling shares in the Thedford, Arkona and East Lambton Telephone Company in 1948 they knew that the system was antiquated. A thorough review of the system's physical assets revealed that there had been no significant upgrades to the system since its original installation. The required upgrades would include: a new switchboard, replacement of all 400 telephones and their installation, and modifications to the outside plant in Thedford and the extreme end of the service area. The total estimated cost for the upgrade was over $30,000. In addition, the rates had not been increased since they were established in 1909. Many changes were in store.

The upgrade program began in 1949 and was completed by 1951. The project began with heavy line reconstruction in 1949–50. Next was the move to a new, more spacious location. The Thedford Legion Hall site was purchased and a new building was erected with final completion in 1951. During this time, the telephone system in Rockwood was purchased as part of the general area upgrade. Finally, when the new office was complete workers could be found stringing countless strands of wires into a distribution frame, connecting them up with a shining, brand-new central switchboard. The newspaper headline boldly declared: "Hurontario Telephones Becoming Modernized.". Office Manager Roy Elliot said the old harmonic-type magneto system first installed in 1909 was being replaced by the common battery system. The conversion scheme would eliminate the need for hand-cranking rural telephones to gain the attention of the operator or another party on the same line.

On October 26, 1950, the company applied to change its name to Hurontario Telephones Limited. At this time there were also new by-laws passed and a capital increase from $10,000 to $50,000 was approved as a way to finance the huge restructuring project.

The conversion to the dial system in May 1962 signaled the beginnings of the modern company it is today. Six years later, as subscribers steadily increased and new residents moved in from larger centres to rural centres, a new exchange was opened at Port Franks. Hurontario Telephones now had 614 subscribers with expectations of many to come with the planning of new subdivisions and the growth in recreational subscribers.

== The year of decision ==
At the end of 1983, formal discussion about a potential sale of North Norwich Municipal Telephone System began. Hurontario Telephones Limited sent an offer to the North Norwich board. Hurontario suggested that the two companies could better face the challenges of new technology and competition by joining. On Friday February 3, 1984 the lead story on page one of Tillsonburg News was "Make bids to buy telephone company." The article outlined the $1,192,785 bid, noting that Hurontario Telephones had also agreed to assume and repay the North Norwich systems substantial debentured debt of $438,500. At the time the news was released, Commissioner Les Buckrell declined public comment, saying the offer was a private matter. However, he did say that any decision to sell the assets of the 80-year-old company would require the majority approval of the 612 subscribers of the North Norwich system as well as the okay of the Ontario Telephone Commission and the Township of Norwich.

In a letter to North Norwich dated March 2, 1984, Hurontario Telephones' Secretary-Treasurer Keith Stevens provided subscribers with a comparison of the two bids. In this comparison two specific pieces of information stand out. Hurontario's existing telephone service rate was significantly lower than that of the other bidder and, perhaps most important, Hurontario's offer would maintain local jobs and presence. This letter also reminded subscribers that Hurontario had worked closely with the Burgessville firm for the last six years providing advice and aid especially during the restoration of service following the disastrous 1979 tornado.

During an early February meeting, subscribers voted to hear further information and interest from other potential buyers before making a final decision; the meeting was adjourned until March 20. Some of the main points of consideration for the shareholders included: sale price, reduction of liability, local presence, future stability of local telephone service and the ability to meet technological changes. On the night of March 20, 1984 a total of 444 votes (336 present and 108 by proxy) were cast. On ballot A - decision to sell the company or not -300 chose the sell option, 139 opted to keep the company while five abstained from voting. On ballot B - selection of a buyer - 342 cast their ballots in favour of Hurontario, 85 came on side for Amtelecom while 17 did not exercise their voting privilege. "The people own it and this (the vote to sell to Hurontario) is what they want. With the majority win, I don’t see any problems."

The North Norwich Municipal Telephone System was sold to North Norwich Telephones Limited, a subsidiary of Hurontario Telephones Limited of Thedford. The new directors included Jim Stevens, John Downs, Paul Downs, Philip Walden and Keith Stevens. Don Stevens joined the board two years later. In May, North Norwich Municipal Telephones presented Norwich Township Mayor John Heleniak with a $440,000 cheque, paying off the debenture of the old telephone system to the township and releasing subscribers from liability on their land. With the official approval from the Ontario Telephone Service Commission, Hurontario Telephones Ltd. took over the company May 24, 1984. North Norwich Telephones Ltd. general manager and secretary Keith Stevens said the May 24 transition went smoothly, in large part because of his familiarity with the Burgessville operation through his consultations with the old company and because of the co-operation of the workers. "If there are any emergency situations either in Burgessville or Thedford, I hope to be able to use the staff members from both operations to help. In an emergency it is good to have a good pool of people to draw from. We hope to increase response time and repairs so it will be a help."

Progress on upgrading the systems was also being made in the summer of 1984, with 0+ dialing and operator assisted dialing available to customers. Also, upgrading was finished in the Norwich area resulting in all multi-party customers being switched to a maximum of a four-party line. While the company was still eyeing one-party-lines, the more urgent upgrading was dealt with in prioritized fashion. Better record keeping of information on buried lines meant repairs were both faster and easier. With the necessary staff in Thedford, the company was also in a position to bury its own cable instead of hiring contractors, as had been the practice in the past. A garage was also built behind the Burgessville office to store equipment and to improve the look of the area. While it was still two years away, the general manager was also looking into the purchase of a computer to handle the billing, inventory and accounting in the Burgessville office.

== Hurontario after the purchase ==
Before an offer was made by Hurontario to buy the Burgessville operation's assets, Keith Stevens had done some consulting for North Norwich, working closely with that company's commissioners and staff. In 1984 the two entities merged into one but were kept as two separate companies for some time. Shares were offered to the previous owners. It was an offer many local residents took the company up on. Meanwhile, the coverage area - in terms of the telephone - remained the same, with Hurontario serving Thedford and the Port Franks areas on the Lake Huron shoreline and North Norwich serving from Woodstock southeast to near Otterville.

Customers of North Norwich Telephones in the Woodstock and Norwich areas had always been switched by Bell Canada. After two years of negotiations with Bell Canada, the company established its own exchanges in Woodstock and Norwich, giving those customers the same free calling area they had with Bell. The Woodstock area (Sweaburg) was connected in November 1987 and named Woodstock Independent with an exchange of 456. Norwich was cut over in May of the following year as Norwich Independent with 468 as the exchange.

As a result of these changes and the increasing demand for special services in 1990, the nature of the company's business has changed dramatically. To improve the reliability of the telephone service, emergency standby generators were purchased for the Burgessville and Port Franks COs as well as portable generators which could be moved between the remote switches. The rural upgrade program, which made private line service available for all customers, was completed in 1990 in the North Norwich area and in 1991 in the Hurontario area.

== Merger and expansion ==
In 1993, North Norwich Telephones merged with Hurontario Telephones to form Hurontario Telecommunications Inc., while retaining the operating names of the two telephone companies. That year, Regional Cable Systems was purchased by Hurontario Telecommunications and renamed Ausable Cablecom Inc.

In 1995 a new office building was built in Burgessville and in 1997 the office in Thedford was renovated and enlarged.

== The Internet ==
After investigation and analysis in 1995, it was decided to offer Internet access starting in the Burgessville area, under the domain name of oxford.net. Shortly after Internet service came to the Thedford region, it was named htl.net (Hurontario Telephones Limited). Success exceeded all expectations and by 1998 there were over 3,000 customers, many of whom were not even telephone customers.

In 1998 company officials were pondering how the company would expand and in what direction. At the time Execulink Internet Services Incorporated was operating out of Woodstock and London. It presented the perfect scenario for talks, which lead to the discovery that the firm was for sale. Negotiations began and the purchase of Execulink was completed.

== Execulink Telecom ==
In 1999 each division was operating under its own name - Hurontario Telephones Limited, North Norwich Telephones, Ausable Cable Com., Execulink Internet Services Corporation as well as the parent company of Hurontario Telecommunications Inc. It was confusing for the customers and impossible to do common marketing. It was decided to find a common name. Consultants were hired, research was conducted and the answer came back that Execulink, while not perfect, had many of the good characteristics of a good company name. A significant amount of money had already been invested from a marketing point of view. It was decided that the name Execulink should be adopted as the name for all the companies. Since 2000 the company has been known by the one name - Execulink, encompassing Execulink Cablecom Inc., Execulink Internet Inc., Execulink Telecom Inc., and the Execulink Group Inc. (the parent company).

From 2000 to 2002, the firm bought another series of Internet Service Providers (ISP), among them MGL in Guelph and the Kitchener area and Odyssey in London, along with a few smaller ones. As these were integrated into the Execulink network, the geographic boundaries expanded in short order. Keith Stevens points with pride to a new and expanding area of coverage that now includes: Wardsville (to the west), Orangeville and Burlington (to the east), and as far north as Arthur and back over to Lake Huron in the Grand Bend and Exeter regions. The company currently touches Lakes Erie, Ontario and Huron and includes the cities of London, St. Thomas, Woodstock, Brantford, Hamilton, Dundas, Burlington, Guelph, Kitchener-Waterloo, Cambridge and Stratford.

In 2002 Execulink got into long-distance services. Initially it was available only to existing telecom subscribers, but now it was available across Canada.

In 2006, Keith Stevens retired from his post of CEO and assumed the role of Chairman of the Board of Directors. Ian Stevens, at the time was VP of Operations, was promoted to CEO.

In March 2012, the $3-million, two-year project with Execulink Telecom and Oxford Country to bring High Speed Internet access to rural residents and businesses was complete. With a $988,333 grant from the province, high-speed Internet coverage is now available to all parts of the county through Internet communities. In many rural areas of the county only dial-up connection was previously available.

Between 2012 and 2015, fibre-optic-based internet, telephone, and TV were introduced in Nairn, Ontario. Soon afterwards, fibre was deployed to the towns of Norwich, Otterville and Delhi.

In January 2013, Execulink launched a new mobile-telephony service.

In October 2013 Company moved to their current Woodstock location amalgamating the majority of staff from the London, Kitchener and Burgessville offices.

In January 2014, Execulink began reselling Rogers Third Party Internet Access to customers across Ontario.

In October 2014, Execulink began reselling Cogeco Third Party Internet Access to customers across Ontario.
