= Tbaytel =

Canadian telecommunication company

- Formerly: Thunder Bay Telephone Company
- Company type: Municipally owned corporation
- Industry: Telecommunications
- Founded: 1902; 124 years ago in Thunder Bay, Ontario, Canada
- Headquarters: Thunder Bay, Ontario, Canada
- Area served: Northern Ontario
- Key people: Paul Norris, President & CEO
- Owner: City of Thunder Bay
- Number of employees: 420
- Website: www.tbaytel.net

Tbaytel, formerly the Thunder Bay Telephone Company, is a municipally owned telecommunications company operating in Thunder Bay, Ontario, Canada, and the surrounding area. Tbaytel's services include data, voice, wireless, internet, digital TV and security.

Tbaytel claims to have Northern Ontario's largest 4G Network within a 300,000 km^{2} area providing coverage along major highway corridors from just west of Sault Ste. Marie to the Manitoba border and north to Red Lake and Geraldton to the US border. Tbaytel operates HSPA+, LTE and 5G networks.

Presently, Tbaytel is the largest independently owned telecommunications provider in Canada. Tbaytel is wholly owned by the Corporation of the City of Thunder Bay. Tbaytel has paid dividends every year since the late 1990s to The City of Thunder Bay, with an annual dividend of approximately $3 million. Today this annual fixed dividend has increased to $17 million. As of 2017, total dividends paid by Tbaytel to the City of Thunder Bay exceed $200 million.

== Services ==
=== Residential ===
- Wireless Service (HSPA+/LTE/5G)
  - Tbaytel Free Public Wi-Fi is Tbaytel's public Wi-Fi service. Available at various public locations throughout Thunder Bay, Dryden, Kenora and Fort Frances for the public to use.
  - 5G Wireless Internet to provide broadband internet services to rural addresses which currently are not serviced by wireline connections.
  - 5G, LTE and HSPA wireless networks available throughout Northwestern Ontario.
  - Tbaytel currently offers limited VoLTE service. Most voice traffic is routed through HSPA+, while data service can utilize LTE where available.
- High Speed Internet is Tbaytel's Internet and Data Services (Internet over VDSL or Optical fibre)
- Tbaytel TV (Digital TV) is Tbaytel's IPTV Services, including High-definition television, Restart TV and Whole Home PVR
  - Crave is a subscription on-demand video streaming service available to Tbaytel TV subscribers.
- Tbaytel Security is Tbaytel's security monitoring service for home and business.
  - Tbaytel offers Smart Home monitoring, Home Security and Personal Medical Alarms.
- tbaytel.net Email Services
- Local Access and Enhanced Services
- Long Distance Phone Services (over POTS or Optical fibre)
- Voice Mail Services
- Telephone and Equipment Rental
- Web Hosting and Website Design

=== Business ===
- Communication & Collaboration
- Managed Network Services
- Internet & Networks
- Wireless
- Security

== History ==
The company was established in 1902, when Thunder Bay Telephone was formed to connect the then-independent communities of Port Arthur and Fort William. When Port Arthur and Fort William amalgamated to form The City of Thunder Bay, Thunder Bay Telephone became a city department. In 2004, Thunder Bay Telephone was renamed to Tbaytel. Tbaytel also appointed its first Municipal Services Board in 2004, allowing it to be operated independently, but it remained 100% owned and operated by the City of Thunder Bay.

== Technological and service advances ==
- In 1902, Isaac Lamont Matthews (Mayor of Port Arthur) and Joshua Dyke (Mayor of Fort William) made the first phone call in the area.
- In 1926, the first long-distance call was completed between the mayors of Fort William and Winnipeg
- In 1949, direct dial calling was available. The first call was made between Hubert Badanai (Mayor of Fort William) and Frederick Oliver Robinson (Mayor of Port Arthur)
- In 1958, mobile radio telephone service was introduced.
- In 1964, direct long-distance dialing came to Thunder Bay
- In 1975, Thunder Bay Telephone installed electronic stored switching equipment
- In 1981, the first digital switching equipment in Northwestern Ontario was installed in Thunder bay
- In 1984, Thunder Bay Telephone installed the first fibre optic cable in Thunder Bay between two exchanges located in Port Arthur and Fort William - spanning over 7 km.
- In 1990, Thunder Bay Telephone launched cellular services
- In 1996, Thunder Bay Telephone offered dial-up internet
- In 1999, Thunder Bay Telephone installed the first digital cellular site in Thunder Bay
- In 2000, Thunder Bay Telephone introduced High-Speed ADSL Internet service in Thunder Bay
- In 2006, Thunder Bay Telephone acquired Superior Wireless to improve cellular service throughout Northwestern Ontario
- In 2007, Tbaytel acquired Apex Security and began offering home security monitoring
- In 2010, Tbaytel announced a partnership with Rogers Wireless and launched a 3G HSPA network serving Northwestern Ontario
- On November 23, 2010, Tbaytel launched their Digital TV Service. At launch, the service provided HDTV, whole-home PVR and web-based scheduling of recordings using Motorola VIP2262 set-top boxes. This made Tbaytel the first telecommunications provider in the region to offer a five-product bundle
- In 2011, Tbaytel upgraded and rebranded its mobility network to a 4G HSPA+ Network
- In November 2012, Tbaytel purchased Dryden Municipal Telephone Service's (DMTS) wireless subscriber base. The DMTS wireless network was shut down in December 2012
- In December 2012, Tbaytel signed a roaming agreement with KNet (Keewaytinook Okimakanak) to allow wireless customers to freely roam between communities north of Tbaytel's serving area and Tbaytel's existing infrastructure
- In 2013, Tbaytel began implementing Fibre to the home
- In 2013, Tbaytel launched Free Public WiFi hotspots throughout Thunder Bay
- On October 1, 2014, Tbaytel decommissioned its legacy CDMA network
- On March 23, 2015, Tbaytel launched a 4G LTE network in Thunder Bay utilizing the AWS spectrum
- In 2017, Tbaytel launched a second LTE carrier utilizing the 700 MHz frequency, which expands coverage and reliability of its LTE network
- On November 6, 2017, Tbaytel expanded its Fibre offerings to the town of Fort Frances, making it Tbaytel's first regional wireline expansion
- On March 22, 2018, Tbaytel announced plans to deliver Tbaytel Fibre to residents and businesses in the City of Dryden, with an anticipated launch date in 2019
- On January 24, 2019, Tbaytel officially launched Fibre service in the city of Dryden.
