= Canadian Radio-television and Telecommunications Commission =

Broadcasting and telecommunications regulator

- Conseil de la radiodiffusion et des télécommuications canadiennes

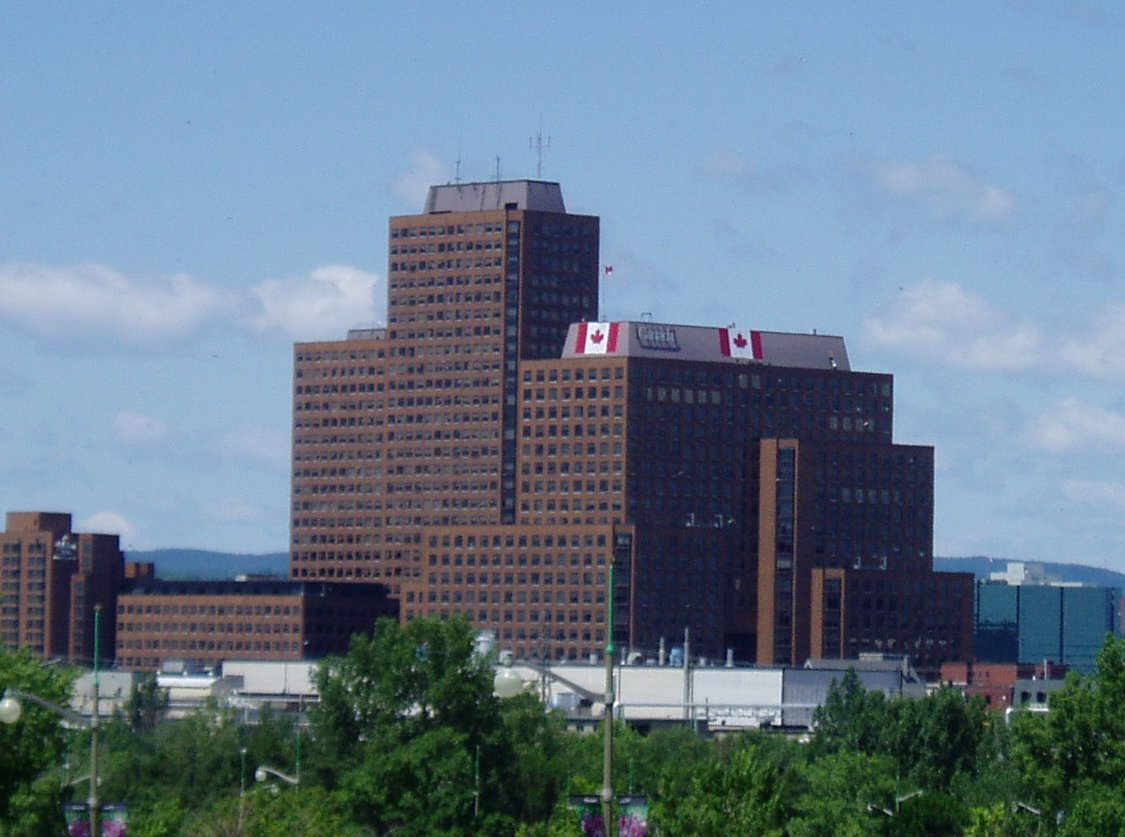
- Terrasses de la Chaudière is the headquarters of the CRTC

Agency overview
- Formed: 1968
- Preceding agency: Board of Broadcast Governors
- Jurisdiction: Government of Canada
- Headquarters: Gatineau, Quebec, Canada
- Minister responsible: Marc Miller, Minister of Canadian Identity and Culture
- Agency executive: Vicky Eatrides, (Chairperson & CEO)
- Parent department: Canadian Heritage
- Website: crtc.gc.ca

The Canadian Radio-television and Telecommunications Commission (CRTC; French: Conseil de la radiodiffusion et des télécommunications canadiennes) is a public organization in Canada tasked with the mandate as a regulatory agency tribunal for various electronic communications, covering broadcasting and telecommunications. It was created in 1976 when it took over responsibility for regulating telecommunication carriers. Prior to 1976, it was known as the Canadian Radio and Television Commission, which was established in 1968 by the Parliament of Canada to replace the Board of Broadcast Governors. Its headquarters is located in the Central Building (Édifice central) of Les Terrasses de la Chaudière in Gatineau, Quebec.

== History ==
The CRTC was originally known as the Canadian Radio-Television Commission. In 1976, jurisdiction over telecommunications services, most of which were then delivered by monopoly common carriers (for example, telephone companies), was transferred to it from the Canadian Transport Commission although the abbreviation CRTC remained the same.

On the telecom side, the CRTC originally regulated only privately held common carriers:

- BC Tel (merged with Telus), which served British Columbia, in which a U.S. company (GTE) held a substantial stake
- Bell Canada, which served much of Ontario and Quebec, and the eastern part of the Northwest Territories (now Nunavut)
- telephone operations owned by crown corporation Canadian National Railways in Newfoundland (Terra Nova Tel), the Northwest Territories, Yukon and northern B.C. (the latter three being Northwestel).

Other telephone companies, many of which were publicly owned and entirely within a province's borders, were regulated by provincial authorities until court rulings during the 1990s affirmed federal jurisdiction over the sector, which also included some fifty small independent incumbents, most of them in Ontario and Quebec. Notable in this group were:

- Newfoundland Telephone
- Maritime Telegraph and Telephone
- Island Telephone (Island Tel)
- New Brunswick Telephone (NBTel)
- Manitoba Telephone System (MTS)
- SaskTel (Saskatchewan)
- Alberta Government Telephones (AGT)
- Northern Telephone (Ontario)
- Télébec
- municipal telephone services in Prince Rupert, B.C. (CityWest) and Thunder Bay (Tbaytel)

== Organisational structure ==
The CRTC is run by up to 13 full-time members (including the chairman, the vice-chairman of broadcasting, and the vice-chairman of telecommunications) appointed by the Cabinet for renewable terms of up to five years. However, unlike the more directly political appointees of the American Federal Communications Commission, the CRTC is an arms-length regulatory body with more autonomous authority over telecommunications. For example, the CRTC's decisions rely more on a judiciary process relying on evidence submitted during public consultations, rather than along party lines as the American FCC is prone to do.

The CRTC Interconnection Steering Committee (CISC) assists in developing information, procedures and guidelines for the CRTC's regulatory activities.

=== Chairs of the CRTC ===
- 1968–1975 – Pierre Juneau
- 1975–1977 – Harry J. Boyle
- 1977–1979 – Pierre Camu
- 1980–1983 – John Meisel
- 1983–1989 – André Bureau
- 1990–1996 – Keith Spicer
- 1996–2001 – Françoise Bertrand
- 2001–2002 – David Colville (interim)
- 2002–2006 – Charles Dalfen
- 2007–2012 – Konrad von Finckenstein
- 2012 – Leonard Katz (interim)
- 2012–2017 – Jean-Pierre Blais
- 2017–2023 – Ian Scott
- 2023–present – Vicky Eatrides

=== Related legislation ===
- Accurate News and Information Act
- Bell Canada Act
- Broadcasting Act
- Canadian Radio-television and Telecommunications Commission Act
- Public Broadcasting Act of 1967 – USA
- Telecommunications Act
- Online Streaming Act

== Jurisdiction ==
The CRTC regulates all Canadian broadcasting and telecommunications activities and enforces rules it creates to carry out the policies assigned to it; the best-known of these is probably the Canadian content rules. The CRTC reports to the Parliament of Canada through the Minister of Canadian Heritage, which is responsible for the Broadcasting Act, and has an informal relationship with Industry Canada, which is responsible for the Telecommunications Act. Provisions in these two acts, along with less-formal instructions issued by the federal cabinet known as orders-in-council, represent the bulk of the CRTC's jurisdiction.

In many cases, such as the cabinet-directed prohibition on foreign ownership for broadcasters and the legislated principle of the predominance of Canadian content, these acts and orders often leave the CRTC less room to change policy than critics sometimes suggest, and the result is that the commission is often the lightning rod for policy criticism that could arguably be better directed at the government itself.

Complaints against broadcasters, such as concerns around offensive programming, are dealt with by the Canadian Broadcast Standards Council (CBSC), an independent broadcast industry association, rather than by the CRTC, although CBSC decisions can be appealed to the CRTC if necessary. However, the CRTC is also sometimes erroneously criticized for CBSC decisions — for example, the CRTC was erroneously criticized for the CBSC's decisions pertaining to the airing of Howard Stern's terrestrial radio show in Canada in the late 1990s, as well as the CBSC's controversial ruling on the Dire Straits song "Money for Nothing".

The commission is not fully equivalent to the U.S. Federal Communications Commission, which has additional powers over technical matters, in broadcasting and other aspects of communications, in that country. In Canada, Innovation, Science and Economic Development Canada (formerly Industry Canada) is responsible for allocating frequencies and call signs, managing the broadcast spectrum, and regulating other technical issues such as interference with electronics equipment.

=== Regulation of broadcast distributors ===
The CRTC has in the past regulated the prices cable television broadcast distributors are allowed to charge. In most major markets, however, prices are no longer regulated due to increased competition for broadcast distribution from satellite television.

The CRTC also regulates which channels broadcast distributors must or may offer. Per the Broadcasting Act the commission also gives priority to Canadian signals—many non-Canadian channels which compete with Canadian channels are thus not approved for distribution in Canada. The CRTC argues that allowing free trade in television stations would overwhelm the smaller Canadian market, preventing it from upholding its responsibility to foster a national conversation. Some people, however, consider this tantamount to censorship.

The CRTC's simultaneous substitution rules require that when a Canadian network licenses a television show from a US network and shows it in the same time slot, upon request by the Canadian broadcaster, Canadian broadcast distributors must replace the show on the US channel with the broadcast of the Canadian channel, along with any overlays and commercials.

As Grey's Anatomy is on ABC, but is carried in Canada on CTV at the same time, for instance, the cable, satellite, or other broadcast distributor must send the CTV feed over the signal of the carried ABC affiliate, even where the ABC version is somehow different, particularly commercials. (These rules are not intended to apply in case of differing episodes of the same series; this difference may not always be communicated to distributors, although this is rather rare.) Viewers via home antenna who receive both American and Canadian networks on their personal sets are not affected by sim-sub.

The goal of this policy is to create a market in which Canadian networks can realize revenue through advertising sales in spite of their inability to match the rates that the much larger American networks can afford to pay for syndicated programming. This policy is also why Canadian viewers do not see American advertisements during the Super Bowl, even when tuning into one of the many American networks carried on Canadian televisions.

The CRTC also regulates radio in Canada, including community radio, where the CRTC requires that at least 15% of each station's output must be locally produced spoken word content.

=== Regulation of the Internet ===
In a major May 1999 decision on "New Media", the CRTC held that under the Broadcasting Act the CRTC had jurisdiction over certain content communicated over the Internet including audio and video, but excluding content that is primarily alphanumeric such as emails and most webpages. It also issued an exemption order committing to a policy of non-interference.

In May 2011, in response to the increase presence of Over-the-Top (OTT) programming, the CRTC put a call out to the public to provide input on the impact OTT programming is having on Canadian content and existing broadcasting subscriptions through satellite and cable.

On October 5, 2011, the CRTC released their findings that included consultations with stakeholders from the telecommunication industry, media producers, and cultural leaders among others. The evidence was inconclusive, suggesting that an increased availability of OTT options is not having a negative impact on the availability or diversity of Canadian content, one of the key policy mandates of the CRTC, nor are there signs that there has been a significant decline of television subscriptions through cable or satellite. However, given the rapid progress in the industry they are working on a more in depth study to be concluded in May 2012.

The CRTC does not directly regulate rates, quality of service issues, or business practices for Internet service providers. However, the CRTC does continually monitor the sector and associated trends. To handle complains, the CRTC was ordered by the Government of Canada to create an independent, industry-funded agency to resolve complaints from consumers and small business retail telecom customers. In July 2007, the Commission for Complaints for Telecom-Television Services (CCTS) opened its doors.

Third Party ISP Access refers to a ruling forcing Cable operators (MSO) to offer Internet access to third party resellers.

=== Regulation of telecommunications services ===
The commission currently has some jurisdiction over the provision of local landline telephone service in Canada. This is largely limited to the major incumbent carriers, such as Bell Canada and Telus, for traditional landline service (but not Voice over Internet Protocol (VoIP)). It has begun the gradual deregulation of such services where, in the commission's opinion, a sufficient level of competition exists.

The CRTC is sometimes blamed for the current state of the mobile phone industry in Canada, in which there are only three national mobile network operators – Bell Mobility, Telus Mobility, and Rogers Wireless – as well as a handful of MVNOs operating on these networks. In fact, the commission has very little to do with the regulation of mobile phone service, outside of "undue preference" issues (for example, a carrier offering a superior rate or service to some subscribers and not others without a good reason).

It does not regulate service rates, service quality, or other business practices, and commission approval is not necessary for wireless provider sales or mergers as in the broadcasting industry. Moreover, it does not deal with the availability of spectrum for mobile phone service, which is part of the Industry Canada mandate, nor the maintenance of competition, which is largely the responsibility of the Competition Bureau.

=== Transfers of ownership/foreign ownership ===
Any transfer of more than 30% of the ownership of a broadcasting licence (including cable/satellite distribution licences) requires advance approval of the commission. One condition normally taken into account in such a decision is the level of foreign ownership; federal regulations require that Canadian citizens ultimately own a majority of a broadcast licence. Usually this takes the form of a public process, where interested parties can express their concerns and sometimes including a public hearing, followed by a commission decision.

While landline and mobile telephone providers must also be majority-owned by Canadians under the federal Telecommunications Act, the CRTC is not responsible for enforcement of this provision. In fact, the commission does not require licences at all for telephone companies, and CRTC approval is therefore not generally required for the sale of a telephone company, unless said company also owns a broadcast licence.

== Notable decisions ==
Since 1987, the CRTC has been involved in several notable decisions, some of which led to controversy and debate.

=== Milestone Radio ===
Milestone Radio: In two separate rounds of licence hearings in the 1990s, the CRTC rejected applications by Milestone Radio to launch a radio station in Toronto which would have been Canada's first urban music station; in both cases, the CRTC instead granted licences to stations that duplicated formats already offered by other stations in the Toronto market. The decision has been widely cited as one of the single most significant reasons why Canadian hip hop had difficulty establishing its commercial viability throughout the 1990s. The CRTC finally granted a licence to Milestone in 2000, after a cabinet order-in-council directed the commission to license two new radio stations that reflected the cultural diversity of the Toronto market, and CFXJ-FM launched in 2001.

=== CHOI-FM ===
CHOI-FM: The CRTC announced it would not renew the licence of the popular radio station CHOI-FM in Quebec City, after having previously sanctioned the station for failing to uphold its promise of performance and then, during the years following, receiving about 50 complaints about offensive behaviour by radio jockeys which similarly contravened CRTC rules on broadcast hate speech. Many thousands of the station's fans marched in the streets and on Parliament Hill against the decision, and the parent company of CHOI, Genex Corp., appealed the CRTC decision unsuccessfully to the Federal Court of Canada.

=== CBC Newsworld ===
CBC Newsworld: The CRTC licensed the CBC on December 1, 1987, to provide a national all-news television network. Its competitor applicant, Alberta-based Allarcom, appealed this decision to the House of Commons of Canada. It was overturned and there were questions of whether federal politicians should meddle in CRTC decisions. Because of this the network launch was delayed from September 1, 1988, to July 31, 1989.

=== RAI International ===
RAI International: In Summer 2004, this Italian government-controlled channel was denied permission to broadcast independently in Canada on the grounds that it had acted and was likely to act contrary to established Canadian policies. RAI International's latest politically appointed President (an avowed right wing nationalist and former spokesperson for Giorgio Almirante, the leader of the post-fascist party of Italy) had unilaterally terminated a 20-year-old agreement and stripped all of its 1,500 to 2,000 annual hours of programming from Telelatino (TLN), a Canadian-run channel which had devoted 95% of its prime time schedule to RAI programs for 20 years since TLN was founded.

All Italian-Canadians were denied RAI programming by RAI International's removal of its programming from the Canadian marketplace, a move intended to create a public outcry and a threat that Canadians would resort to using satellite viewing cards obtained via the US in order to watch RAI, even though these cards were either grey market or black market, according to different analyses (see below). Following unprecedented foreign led and domestic political interference with the CRTC's quasi-judicial independent regulatory process, within six months of its original decision, an abrupt CRTC "review" of its policy on third-language foreign services determined to drop virtually all restrictions and adopt a new "open entry" approach to foreign controlled "third language" (non-English, non-French) channels.

=== Al Jazeera ===
Al Jazeera: Was approved by the CRTC in 2004 as an optional cable and satellite offering, but on the condition that any carrier distributing it must edit out any instances of illegal hate speech. Cable companies declared that these restrictions would make it too expensive to carry Al Jazeera. Although no cable company released data as to what such a monitoring service would cost, the end-result was that no cable company elected to carry the station, either, leaving many Arabic-speaking Canadians using free-to-air satellite dishes to watch the station.

The Canadian Jewish Congress has expressed its opinion over possible anti-Semitic incitement on this station and that the restrictions on Al Jazeera are appropriate, while the Canadian B'nai Brith is opposed to any approval of Al Jazeera in Canada. The CRTC ruling applied to Al Jazeera and not to its English-speaking sister network Al Jazeera English, which was launched two years after the ruling.

=== Fox News Channel ===
Fox News Channel: Until 2004, the CRTC's apparent reluctance to grant a digital licence to Fox News Channel under the same policy which made it difficult for RAI to enter the country – same-genre competition from foreign services – had angered many conservative Canadians, who believed the network was deliberately being kept out due to its perceived conservative bias, particularly given the long-standing availability of services such as CNN and BBC World in Canada.

On November 18, 2004, however, the CRTC approved an application by cable companies to offer Fox News Channel on the digital cable tier. Fox commenced broadcasting in Canada shortly thereafter.

=== Satellite radio ===
Satellite radio: In June 2005, the CRTC outraged some Canadian cultural nationalists (such as the Friends of Canadian Broadcasting) and labour unions by licensing two companies, Canadian Satellite Radio and Sirius Canada to offer satellite radio services in Canada. The two companies are in partnership with American firms XM Satellite Radio and Sirius Satellite Radio respectively, and in accordance with the CRTC decision will only need to offer ten percent Canadian content. The CRTC contends that this low level of Canadian content, particularly when compared to the 35% rule on local radio stations, was necessary because unlicensed U.S. receivers were already flooding into the country, so that enforcing a ban on these receivers would be nearly impossible (see below).

This explanation did not satisfy cultural nationalists, who demanded that the federal cabinet overturn the decision and mandate a minimum of 35% Canadian content. Supporters of the decision argue that satellite radio can only be feasibly set up as a continental system, and trying to impose 35% Canadian content across North America is quite unrealistic. They also argue that satellite radio will boost Canadian culture by giving vital exposure to independent artists, instead of concentrating just on the country's stars, and point to the CRTC's successful extraction of promises to program 10% Canadian content on satellite services already operational in the United States as important concessions. Despite popular perception that the CRTC banned Sirius Canada from broadcasting Howard Stern's program, this is not the case. Sirius Canada in fact initially chose not to air Stern based on the possibility of a future issue with the CRTC, although the company reversed its decision and began offering Howard Stern in 2006.

=== 2008 Ottawa radio licence ===
2008 Ottawa radio licences: On November 21, 2008, federal Minister of Canadian Heritage and Official Languages James Moore issued a statement calling on the CRTC to review its approval of two new radio stations, Frank Torres' CIDG-FM and Astral Media's CJOT-FM, which it had licensed in August 2008 to serve the Ottawa-Gatineau radio market. Moore asked the commission to assess whether the francophone population of the Ottawa-Gatineau area was sufficiently well-served by existing French radio services, and to consider licensing one or more of the French language applications, which included a Christian music station, a community radio station and a campus radio station for the Université du Québec en Outaouais, in addition to or instead of the approved stations. The review ultimately identified a viable frequency for a third station, and CJFO-FM launched in 2010.

=== Bell Canada usage-based Internet billing ===
Bell Canada usage-based billing: On October 28, 2010, the CRTC handed down its final decision on how wholesale customers can be billed by large network owners. Under the plan which starts within 90 days, Bell will be able to charge wholesale service providers a flat monthly fee to connect to its network, and for a set monthly usage limit per each ISP customer the ISP has. Beyond that set limit, individual users will be charged per gigabyte, depending on the speed of their connections.

Customers using the fastest connections of five megabits per second, for example, will have a monthly allotment of 60 GB, beyond which Bell will charge $1.12 per GB to a maximum of $22.50. If a customer uses more than 300 GB a month, Bell will also be able to implement an additional charge of 75 cents per gigabyte. In May 2010, the CRTC ruled that Bell could not implement its usage-based billing system until all of its own retail customers had been moved off older, unlimited downloading plans. The requirement would have meant that Bell would have to move its oldest and most loyal customers.

The CRTC also added that Bell would be required to offer to wholesale ISPs the same usage insurance plan it sells to retail customers. Bell appealed both requirements, citing that the rules do not apply to cable companies and that they constituted proactive rate regulation by the CRTC, which goes against government official policy direction that the regulator only intervene in markets after a competitive problem has been proven. In Thursday's decision, the CRTC rescinded both requirements, thereby giving Bell the go-ahead to implement usage-based billing. This ruling according to Teksavvy handcuffs the competitive market. This has been asked by Stephen Harper and Parliament to have the decision reviewed. According to a tweet by Industry Minister Tony Clement, unless the CRTC reverses this decision, the government will use its override power to reverse the decision.

== Reception of non-Canadian services ==
While an exact number has not been determined, thousands of Canadians have purchased and used what they contend to be grey market radio and television services, licensed in the United States but not in Canada. Users of these unlicensed services contend that they are not directly breaking any laws by simply using the equipment. The equipment is usually purchased from an American supplier (although some merchants have attempted to set up shop in Canada) and the services are billed to an American postal address. The advent of online billing and the easy availability of credit card services has made it relatively easy for almost anyone to maintain an account in good standing, regardless of where they actually live.

Sec. 9(1)(c) of the Radiocommunication Act creates a prohibition against all decoding of encrypted programming signals, followed by an exception where authorization is received from the person holding the lawful right in Canada to transmit and authorize decoding of the signal. This means receiving the encrypted programming of DishNetwork or DirecTV, even with a grey market subscription, may be construed as unlawful (this remains an unresolved Constitutional issue).

Notwithstanding, possession of DishNetwork or DirecTV equipment is not unlawful as provided by the Radiocommunication Act Section 4(1)(b), which states:

"No person shall, except under and in accordance with a radio authorization, install, operate or possess radio apparatus, other than (b)a radio apparatus that is capable only of the reception of broadcasting and that is not a distribution undertaking. (radio apparatus" means a device or combination of devices intended for, or capable of being used for, radiocommunication)."

Satellite radio poses a more complicated problem for the CRTC. While an unlicensed satellite dish can often be identified easily, satellite radio receivers are much more compact and can rarely be easily identified, at least not without flagrantly violating provisions against unreasonable search and seizure in the Canadian Charter of Rights and Freedoms. Some observers argued that this influenced the CRTC's June 2005 decision to ease Canadian content restrictions on satellite radio (see above).

== See also ==
- List of telecommunications regulatory bodies
- Demographics of Canada
- Category A services
- Category B services
- Canadian Independent Telephone Association
- CPAC (TV channel)
- Electronic Communications Convention
- Fee-for-carriage
- Friends of Canadian Broadcasting
- Innovation, Science and Economic Development Canada
- International Telecommunication Union
- Inter-American Telecommunication Commission (CITEL)
- Music of Canada (Internet broadcasting)
- Ontario Telecommunications Association
- Ontario Telephone Service Commission
- Régie des télécommunications du Québec
