= Internet Protocol television =

Television transmitted over a computer network

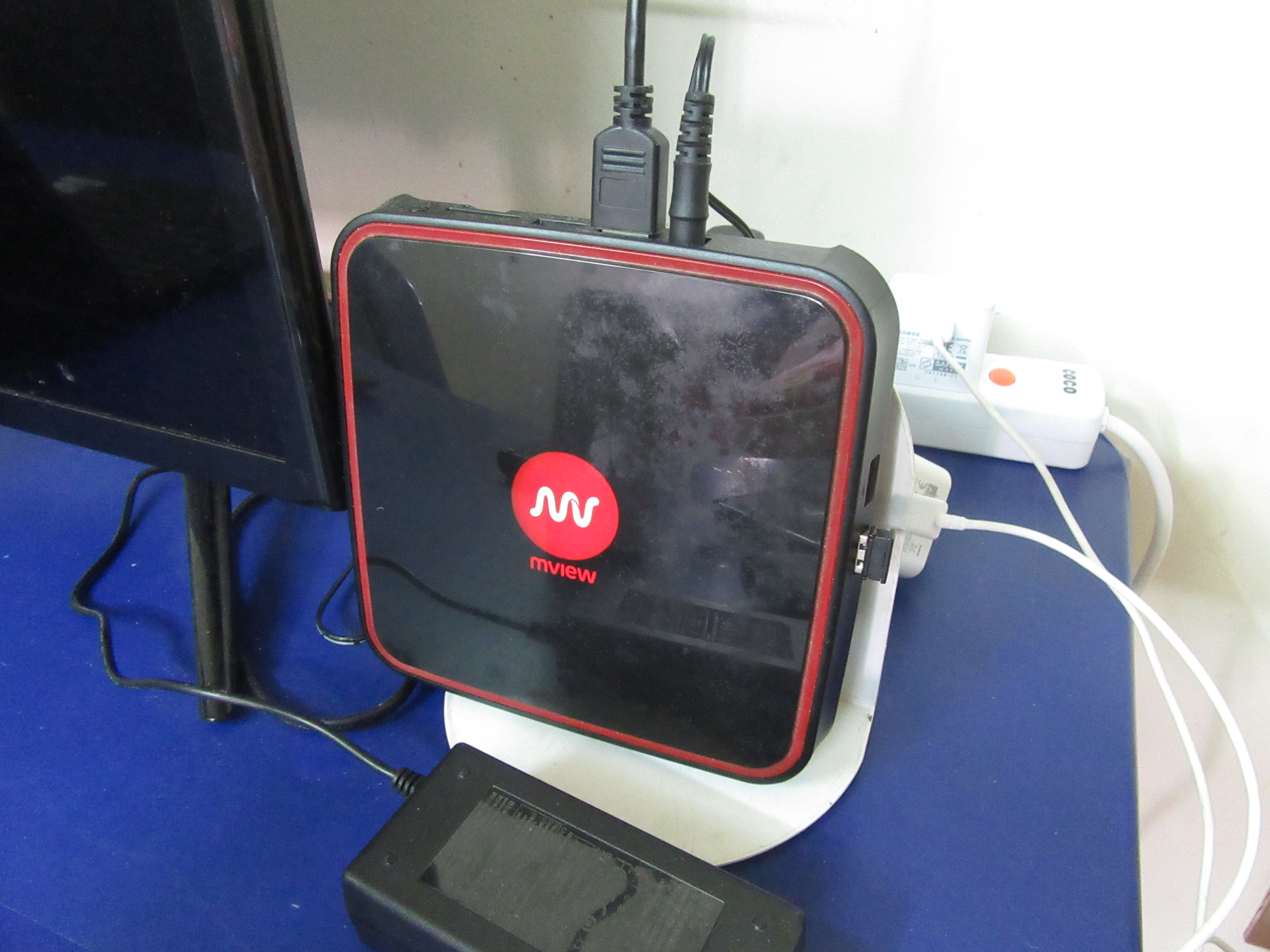
An IPTV set-top box connected to a TV set, designed to receive television from a service called Mview

Internet Protocol television (IPTV), also called TV over broadband, is the service delivery of television over Internet Protocol (IP) networks. Usually sold and run by a telecom provider, it consists of broadcast live television that is streamed over the Internet (multicast) — in contrast to delivery through traditional terrestrial, satellite, and cable transmission formats — as well as video on demand services for watching or replaying content (unicast).

IPTV broadcasts started gaining usage during the 2000s alongside the rising use of broadband-based internet connections. It is often provided bundled with internet access services by Internet service providers (ISPs) to subscribers and runs in a closed network. IPTV normally requires the use of a set-top box, which receives the encoded television content in the MPEG transport stream via IP multicast, and converts the packets to be watched on a TV set or other kind of display. It is distinct from over-the-top (OTT) services, which are based on a direct one-to-one transmission mechanism.

IPTV methods have been standardised by organisations such as ETSI. IPTV has found success in some regions: for example in Western Europe in 2015, pay IPTV users overtook pay satellite TV users. IPTV is also used for media delivery around corporate and private networks.

== Definition ==
Historically, many different definitions of IPTV have appeared, including elementary streams over IP networks, MPEG transport streams over IP networks and a number of proprietary systems. One official definition approved by the International Telecommunication Union focus group on IPTV (ITU-T FG IPTV) is:

IPTV is defined as multimedia services such as television/video/audio/text/graphics/data delivered over IP-based networks managed to provide the required level of quality of service and experience, security, interactivity and reliability.

Another definition of IPTV, relating to the telecommunications industry, is the one given by Alliance for Telecommunications Industry Solutions (ATIS) IPTV Exploratory Group in 2005:

IPTV is defined as the secure and reliable delivery to subscribers of entertainment video and related services. These services may include, for example, Live TV, Video On Demand (VOD) and Interactive TV (iTV). These services are delivered across an access agnostic, packet switched network that employs the IP protocol to transport the audio, video and control signals. In contrast to video over the public Internet, with IPTV deployments, network security and performance are tightly managed to ensure a superior entertainment experience, resulting in a compelling business environment for content providers, advertisers and customers alike.

== History ==
Up until the early 1990s, it was not a concept that a television programme could be squeezed into the limited telecommunication bandwidth of a copper telephone cable to provide a video-on-demand (VOD) television service of acceptable quality, as the required bandwidth of a digital television signal was around 200 Mbit/s, which was 2,000 times greater than the bandwidth of a speech signal over a copper telephone wire. VOD services were only made possible as a result of two major technological developments: motion-compensated DCT video compression and asymmetric digital subscriber line (ADSL) data transmission. Motion-compensated DCT algorithms for video coding standards include the H.26x formats from 1988 onwards and the MPEG formats from 1991 onwards. Motion-compensated DCT video compression significantly reduced the amount of bandwidth required for a television signal, while at the same time ADSL increased the bandwidth of data that could be sent over a copper telephone wire. ADSL increased the bandwidth of a telephone line from around 0.1 Mbit/s to 2 Mbit/s, while DCT compression reduced the required bandwidth of a digital television signal from around 200 Mbit/s down to about 2 Mbit/s. The combination of DCT and ADSL technologies made it possible to practically implement VOD services at around 2 Mbit/s bandwidth in the 1990s.

The term IPTV first appeared in 1995 with the founding of Precept Software by Judith Estrin and Bill Carrico. Precept developed an Internet video product named IP/TV. IP/TV was an Mbone compatible Windows and Unix-based application that transmitted single and multi-source audio and video traffic, ranging from low to DVD quality, using both unicast and IP multicast Real-time Transport Protocol (RTP) and Real time control protocol (RTCP). The software was written primarily by Steve Casner, Karl Auerbach, and Cha Chee Kuan. Precept was acquired by Cisco Systems in 1998. Cisco retains the IP/TV trademark.

Telecommunications company US West (later Qwest) launched an IPTV service called TeleChoice in Phoenix, Arizona in 1998 using VDSL technology, becoming the first company in the United States to provide digital television over telephone lines. The service was shut down in 2008.

Internet radio company AudioNet started the first continuous live webcasts with content from WFAA-TV in January 1998 and KCTU-LP on 10 January 1998.

Kingston Communications, a regional telecommunications operator in the UK, launched Kingston Interactive Television (KIT), an IPTV over digital subscriber line (DSL) service in September 1999. The operator added additional VOD service in October 2001 with Yes TV, a VOD content provider. Kingston was one of the first companies in the world to introduce IPTV and IP VOD over ADSL as a commercial service. The service became the reference for various changes to UK Government regulations and policy on IPTV. In 2006, the KIT service was discontinued, subscribers having declined from a peak of 10,000 to 4,000.

In 1999, NBTel (now known as Bell Aliant) was the first to commercially deploy Internet protocol television over DSL in Canada using the Alcatel 7350 DSLAM and middleware created by iMagic TV (owned by NBTel's parent company Bruncor). The service was marketed under the brand VibeVision in New Brunswick, and later expanded into Nova Scotia in early 2000 after the formation of Aliant. iMagic TV was later sold to Alcatel.

In 2005, Bredbandsbolaget launched its IPTV service as the first service provider in Sweden.

In 2010, CenturyLink – after acquiring Embarq (2009) and Qwest (2010) – entered five U.S. markets with an IPTV service called Prism. Later in 2010, Bell Canada (a major division of BCE) announced it would begin offering residential and business/commercial customers in Montreal, Quebec and Toronto, Ontario IPTV over a number of different modalities, including fibre to the home, fibre to the node and DSL.

== Architecture ==
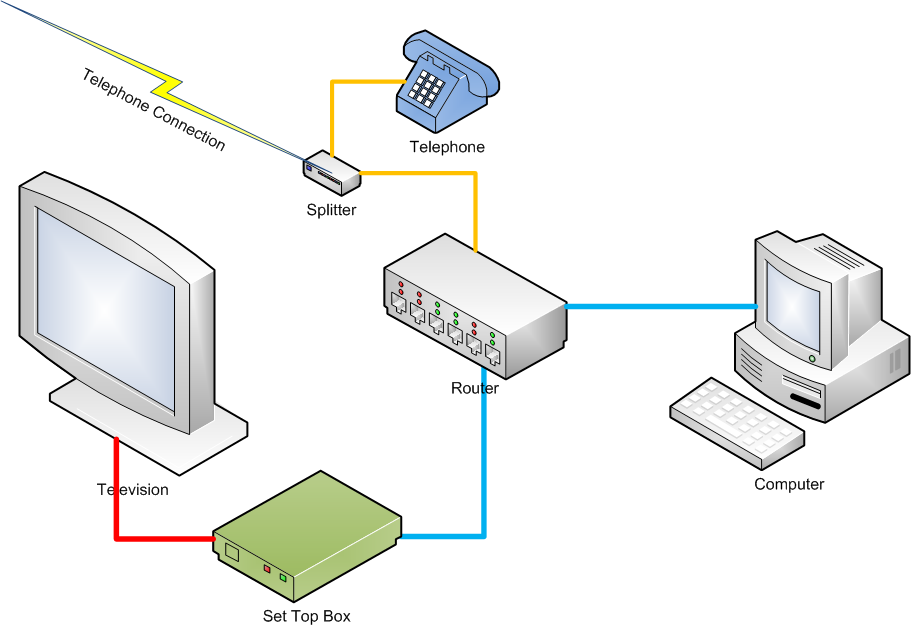
A simplified network diagram for IPTV

=== Elements ===
An IPTV head-end is a place where live TV channels and AV sources are encoded, encrypted, and delivered as IP multicast streams. Meanwhile, a video on demand (VOD) platform stores on-demand video assets and serves them as IP unicast streams when a user requests them. Sometimes, the VOD platform is located within the IPTV head-end. An interactive portal allows users to navigate within the different IPTV services, such as the VOD catalogue. A delivery network is a packet-switched network that carries IP packets, including unicast and multicast streams. Endpoints refer to user equipment that can request, decode, and deliver IPTV streams for display to the user. This can include computers, mobile devices, and set-top boxes. At a residential IPTV user's home, the home TV gateway is the piece of equipment that terminates the access link from the delivery network. Lastly, the user set-top box is the piece of endpoint equipment that decodes and decrypts TV and VOD streams for display on the TV screen.

=== Architecture of a video server network ===
Depending on the network architecture of the service provider, there are two main types of video server architecture that can be considered for IPTV deployment: centralised and distributed.

The centralised architecture model is a relatively simple and easy-to-manage solution. Because all media content is stored in centralised servers, it does not require a comprehensive content distribution system. Centralised architecture is generally good for a network that provides relatively small VOD service deployment, has adequate core and edge bandwidth or has an efficient content delivery network (CDN).

A distributed architecture has bandwidth usage advantages and inherent system management features that are essential for managing a larger server network. Distributed architecture requires intelligent and sophisticated content distribution technologies to augment effective delivery of multimedia content over the service provider's network.

=== Residential IPTV home networks ===
In many cases, the residential gateway that provides connectivity with the Internet access network is not located close to the IPTV set-top box. This scenario becomes very common as service providers start to offer service packages with multiple set-top boxes per subscriber.

Networking technologies that take advantage of existing home wiring (such as power lines, phone lines or coaxial cables) or of Wireless hardware have become common solutions for this problem, although fragmentation in the wired home networking market has limited somewhat the growth in this market.

In December 2008, ITU-T adopted Recommendation G.hn (also known as G.9960), which is a next-generation home networking standard that specifies a common PHY/MAC that can operate over any home wiring (power lines, phone lines or coaxial cables).

Groups such as the Multimedia over Coax Alliance, HomePlug Powerline Alliance, Home Phoneline Networking Alliance, and Quasar Alliance (Plastic Optical Fibre) each advocate their own technologies.

=== IMS-based architecture ===
There is a growing standardisation effort on the use of the 3GPP IP Multimedia Subsystem (IMS) as an architecture for supporting IPTV services in telecommunications carrier networks. Both ITU-T and ETSI are working on so-called "IMS-based IPTV" standards (see e.g. ETSI TS 182 027). Carriers will be able to offer both voice and IPTV services over the same core infrastructure and the implementation of services combining conventional TV services with telephony features (e.g., caller ID on the TV screen) will become straightforward.

== Protocols ==
IPTV supports both live TV as well as stored video-on-demand. Playback requires a device connected to either a fixed or wireless IP network in the form of a standalone personal computer, smartphone, touch screen tablet, game console, connected TV or set-top box. Content is compressed by Video and audio codecs and then encapsulated in MPEG transport stream or Real-time Transport Protocol or other packets. IP multicasting allows for live data to be sent to multiple receivers using a single multicast group address.

In standards-based IPTV systems, the primary underlying protocols used are:

- Service-provider-based streaming:
  - IGMP for subscribing to a live multicast stream (TV channel) and for changing from one live multicast stream to another (TV channel change). IP multicast operates within LANs (including VLANs) and across WANs also. IP multicast is usually routed in the network core by Protocol Independent Multicast (PIM), setting up correct distribution of multicast streams (TV channels) from their source all the way to the customers who wants to view them, duplicating received packets as needed. On-demand content uses a negotiated unicast connection. Real-time Transport Protocol (RTP) over User Datagram Protocol (UDP) or the lower overhead H.222 transport stream over Transmission Control Protocol (TCP) are generally the preferred methods of encapsulation.

== Via satellite ==
Although IPTV and conventional satellite TV distribution have been seen as complementary technologies, they are likely to be increasingly used together in hybrid IPTV networks. IPTV is largely neutral to the transmission medium, and IP traffic is already routinely carried by satellite for Internet backbone trunking and corporate VSAT networks.

The copper twisted pair cabling that forms the last mile of the telephone and broadband network in many countries is not able to provide a sizeable proportion of the population with an IPTV service that matches even existing terrestrial or satellite digital TV distribution. For a competitive multi-channel TV service, a connection speed of 20 Mbit/s is likely to be required, but unavailable to most potential customers. The increasing popularity of high-definition television increases connection speed requirements or limits IPTV service quality and connection eligibility even further.

However, satellites are capable of delivering in excess of 100 Gbit/s via multi-spot beam technologies, making satellite a clear emerging technology for implementing IPTV networks. Satellite distribution can be included in an IPTV network architecture in several ways. The simplest to implement is an IPTV-direct to home (DTH) architecture, in which hybrid DVB-broadband set-top boxes in subscriber homes integrate satellite and IP reception to give additional bandwidth with return channel capabilities. In such a system, many live TV channels may be multicast via satellite and supplemented with stored video-on-demand transmission via the broadband connection. Arqiva’s Satellite Media Solutions Division suggests "IPTV works best in a hybrid format. For example, you would use broadband to receive some content and satellite to receive other, such as live channels".

== Hybrid IPTV ==
Hybrid IPTV refers to the combination of traditional broadcast TV services and video delivered over either managed IP networks or the public Internet. It is an increasing trend in both the consumer and pay TV markets.

The growth of Hybrid IPTV is driven by two major factors. Since the emergence of online video aggregation sites, like YouTube and Vimeo in the mid-2000s, traditional pay TV operators have come under increasing pressure to provide their subscribers with a means of viewing Internet-based video on their televisions. At the same time, specialist IP-based operators have looked for ways to offer analogue and digital terrestrial services to their operations, without adding either additional cost or complexity to their transmission operations. Bandwidth is a valuable asset for operators, so many have looked for alternative ways to deliver these new services without investing in additional network infrastructures.

A hybrid set-top allows content from a range of sources, including terrestrial broadcast, satellite, and cable, to be brought together with video delivered over the Internet via an Ethernet connection on the device. This enables television viewers to access a greater variety of content on their TV sets, without the need for a separate box for each service. Hybrid IPTV set-top boxes may also enable users to access a range of advanced interactive services, such as VOD, catch-up TV, as well as Internet applications, including video telephony, surveillance, gaming, shopping, e-government accessed via a television set.

From a pay-TV operator's perspective, a hybrid IPTV set-top box gives them greater long-term flexibility to deploy new services and applications as and when consumers require, most often without the need to upgrade equipment or for a technician to visit and reconfigure or swap out the device. This reduces the cost of launching new services, increases speed to market and limits disruption for consumers.

The Hybrid Broadcast Broadband TV (HbbTV) consortium of industry companies the establishment of an open European standard for hybrid set-top boxes for the reception of broadcast and broadband digital TV and multimedia applications with a single user interface. These trends led to the development of Hybrid Broadcast Broadband TV set-top boxes that included both a broadcast tuner and an Internet connection – usually via an Ethernet port. The first commercially available hybrid IPTV set-top box was developed by Advanced Digital Broadcast, a developer of digital television hardware and software, in 2005. The platform was developed for Spanish pay TV operator Telefonica, and used as part of its Movistar TV service, launched to subscribers at the end of 2005.

An alternative approach is the IPTV version of the Headend in the Sky cable TV solution. Here, multiple TV channels are distributed via satellite to the ISP or IPTV provider's point of presence (POP) for IP-encapsulated distribution to individual subscribers as required by each subscriber. This can provide a huge selection of channels to subscribers without overburdening the incoming Internet to the POP, and enables an IPTV service to be offered to small or remote operators outside the reach of terrestrial high-speed WAN connection. An example is a network combining fibre and satellite distribution via an SES New Skies satellite of 95 channels to Latin America and the Caribbean, operated by IPTV Americas.

== Advantages ==
The Internet protocol-based platform offers significant advantages, including the ability to integrate television with other IP-based services like high-speed Internet access and VoIP.

A switched IP network also allows for the delivery of significantly more content and functionality. In a typical TV or satellite network, using broadcast video technology, all the content constantly flows downstream to each customer, and the customer switches the content at the set-top box. The customer can select from as many choices as the telecomms, cable or satellite company can stuff into the pipe flowing into the home. A switched IP network works differently. Content remains in the network, and only the content the customer selects is sent to the customer's home. That frees up bandwidth, and the customer's choice is less restricted by the size of the pipe into the home.

=== Interactivity ===
An IP-based platform also allows significant opportunities to make the TV viewing experience more interactive and personalised. The provider may, for example, include an interactive programme guide that allows viewers to search for content by title or actor's name, or a picture-in-picture functionality that allows them to channel surf without leaving the programme they're watching. Viewers may be able to look up a player's stats while watching a sports game or control the camera angle. They also may be able to access photos or music from their PC on their television, use a wireless phone to schedule a recording of their favourite show, or even adjust parental controls so their child can watch a documentary for a school report, while they're away from home.

A feedback channel from the viewer to the provider is required for this interactivity. Terrestrial, satellite, and some cable networks for television do not feature a feedback channel and thus don't allow interactivity. However, interactivity with those networks can be possible by combining TV networks with data networks such as the Internet or a mobile communication network.

=== Video on demand ===
IPTV technology is used for video on demand (VOD), which permits a customer to browse an online programme or film catalogue, to watch trailers and to then select a program. The playout of the selected item starts nearly instantaneously on the customer's TV or PC.

Technically, when the customer selects the program, a point-to-point unicast connection is set up between the customer's decoder (set-top box or PC) and the delivering streaming server. The signalling for the trick mode functionality (pause, slow-motion, wind/rewind etc.) may be communicated using, for instance, RTSP.

In an attempt to avoid content piracy, the VOD content is usually encrypted and digital rights management may be applied. A film that is chosen, for example, may be playable for 24 hours following payment, after which time it becomes unavailable.

=== IPTV-based converged services ===
Another advantage is the opportunity for integration and convergence. This opportunity is amplified when using IMS-based solutions. Converged services implies interaction of existing services in a seamless manner to create new value-added services. One example is on-screen caller ID, getting caller ID on a TV, and the ability to handle the call (send it to voice mail, etc.). IP-based services help to provide consumers anytime and anywhere access to content over their televisions, PCs, and mobile device, and to integrate services and content to tie them together. Within businesses and institutions, IPTV eliminates the need to run a parallel infrastructure to deliver live and stored video services.

== Limitations ==
IPTV is sensitive to packet loss and delays. An IPTV channel has a minimum bandwidth requirement. Some systems are able to adapt to lower available bandwidth by reducing picture quality.

Although a few countries have very high-speed broadband-enabled populations, (Note: South Korea, for instance, has 6 million homes benefiting from a minimum connection speed of 100 Mbit/s.) in other countries legacy networks struggle to provide 3–5 Mbit/s and so simultaneous use of IPTV, VOIP and Internet access may not be viable. The last-mile delivery for IPTV usually has a bandwidth restriction that only allows a small number of simultaneous TV channel streams – typically from one to three – to be delivered.

=== Latency ===
The network delay inherent in the use of satellite Internet access is often held up as a reason why satellites cannot be successfully used for IPTV. In practice, however, delay is not an important factor for IPTV, since it is a service that does not require real-time transmission, as is the case with telephony or videoconferencing services. It is the delay of response to requests to change channel, display an EPG, etc. that most affects customers’ perceived quality of service.

Existing video transmission systems of both analogue and digital formats already introduce known quantifiable delays. Existing DVB TV channels that simulcast by both terrestrial and satellite transmissions experience the same 0.25-second delay difference between the two services with no detrimental effect, and it goes unnoticed by viewers.

== Privacy implications ==
Due to limitations in bandwidth, an IPTV channel is delivered to the user one at a time. Changing a channel requires requesting the head-end server to provide a different broadcast stream, much like VOD. (Note: For VOD, the stream is delivered using unicast whereas IPTV typically uses multicast.) This could enable the service provider to accurately track each and every programme watched and the duration of watching for each viewer. In conjunction with regulatory differences between IPTV and cable TV, this tracking could pose a threat to privacy according to critics. For IP multicast scenarios, since a particular multicast group (TV channel) needs to be requested before it can be viewed, the same privacy concerns apply.

== Service bundling ==
For residential users, IPTV is often provided in conjunction with VOD and may be bundled with Internet services such as Internet access and voice over Internet Protocol (VoIP) telecommunications services. Commercial bundling of IPTV, VoIP and Internet access is sometimes referred to in marketing as triple play service. When these three are offered with cellular service, the combined service may be referred to as quadruple play.

== Regulation ==
Historically, cable TV operators have been regulated differently from telecommunication operators. As IPTV allows TV and VOD to be transmitted over the Internet, new regulatory issues arise. Professor Eli M. Noam highlights in his report "TV or Not TV: Three Screens, One Regulation?" some of the key challenges with sector-specific regulation that is becoming obsolete due to convergence in this field.

== See also ==
- Content delivery network
- DVB-IPTV
- Hybrid Broadcast Broadband TV
- Over-the-top media service
- P2PTV
- SAT>IP
- Software as a service
- Streaming television
