= Stentor Alliance =

Alliance of telecommunications companies in Canada

- Formation: 1992
- Dissolved: 2004
- Type: Telecommunications industry alliance
- Purpose: Standardization, marketing, lobbying & technology coordination among Canadian local exchange carriers
- Headquarters: Canada
- Region served: Canada
- Services: National advertising, shared services, Internet & telecom product rollouts, revenue pooling
- Members: Alberta Government Telephones (now Telus); BC Tel (now part of Telus); Bell Canada; Island Telephone (now Bell Aliant); Manitoba Telephone System (now Bell MTS); Maritime Telephone & Telegraph (now Bell Aliant); NBTel (now Bell Aliant); Newfoundland Telephone (now Bell Aliant); Northwestel (associate); Québec Téléphone (associate, now Telus Québec); SaskTel
- Subsidiaries: Stentor Resource Centre Inc. (SRCI), Stentor Telecom Policy Inc. (STPI), Stentor Canadian Network Management (SCNM), Signature Service Centre (SSC)
- Staff: c. 1,800 (at peak)
- Formerly called: Trans‑Canada Telephone System (1931), Telecom Canada

The Stentor Alliance was a formal alliance of Canada's major telecommunications companies, specifically its incumbent local exchange carriers. It derives its name from the Greek mythological figure Stentor.

The system originally formed in 1931 as the Telephone Association of Canada, soon becoming the Trans-Canada Telephone System and operating under this name for most of its history. It was briefly known as Telecom Canada before becoming Stentor in 1992. The group began dissolving in 1999, with the last unit closing in 2004.

The alliance comprised the following companies at the time of inception:

- Alberta Government Telephones, now Telus
- BC Tel, now part of Telus
- Bell Canada
- Island Telephone Company, now part of Bell Aliant
- Manitoba Telephone System, now Bell MTS
- Maritime Telephone and Telegraph Company, now part of Bell Aliant
- NBTel, now part of Bell Aliant
- Newfoundland Telephone, now part of Bell Aliant
- Northwestel (associate member)
- Québec Téléphone, now part of Telus (associate member)
- SaskTel (Saskatchewan Telecommunications)

The Trans-Canada and Telecom Canada alliances were ostensibly formed to provide for the standardization of local and long-distance telephone services across Canada, as well as provide for consistency in lobbying efforts with provincial and federal governments. By the time Stentor replaced Telecom Canada, internet service was part of the alliance's objectives.

In practice, Stentor was also an advertising unit, coordinating national advertising and sponsorships (such as sponsorship of the Olympic Games). The nine full member companies also participated in revenue pooling, and could quickly introduce new services to all nine members. Other telephone companies had to negotiate with Stentor or its predecessors to offer such services as 800 and 900 service.

The alliance controlled the following organizations:

- Stentor Resource Centre Inc. (SRCI)
- Stentor Telecom Policy Inc. (STPI)
- Stentor Canadian Network Management (SCNM)
- Signature Service Centre (SSC)

On January 1, 1999, SRCI and SSC were disbanded and their roles reassumed by their parent organizations, with SCNM remaining in place in a modified form. STPI was dissolved in 2004 after its role had also diminished as the companies took divergent paths. At the time of dissolution, about 1,800 people were employed by Stentor.

Many of the Stentor companies have since become competitors, with several joining with Stentor's former competitors (Sprint, Rogers). Bell - the parent of Aliant, NorthwesTel, Télébec and Northern Telephone - almost immediately entered competition with Telus; Bell's ties with SaskTel have also weakened since then.

== See also ==
- Stentor (disambiguation)
