= Island Telecom =

Canadian internet service provider

Island Telecom Inc.
- Type: Private
- Headquarters: Summerside, Prince Edward Island, Canada

Island Telecom Inc. was a Canadian internet service provider in Prince Edward Island. Its headquarters is located in Summerside.

In 2014 a group of Internet Service Providers in Prince Edward Island was consolidated under the Island Telecom brand name; the legal name of "Island Telecom Inc." applies to the main company. In January 2015 it was announced that Island Telecom henceforth was to operate fixed-wireless internet service provider Route 2, which had until then been municipally owned by the City of Summerside. This created a third player in the marketplace behind Bell Aliant and Eastlink. Island Telecom serves 20 Mbit/s throughout Prince Edward Island as of 2015 and 100 Mbit/s in certain areas of the province as of 2016. In 2018 the company, through related companies, began offering 1 Gbit/s and 10 Gbit/s services on its province-wide fibre optic network.

The member companies of Island Telecom are ISN Wireless, Ruranet, Kennet, and Route 2. The combined companies service the vast majority of the province of Prince Edward Island with a combination of cable, DSL, fibre optic, and fixed-wireless connectivity options. It provides gigabit fibre service under the Optra name in Summerside, Prince Edward Island, making that city one of only a handful in Canada to have true Gigabit fibre service.

Island Telecom introduced digital phone service in 2016, available on the cable, Optra fibre, and next-generation fixed-wireless networks. While the voice quality is very high due to the all-digital technology, digital phone service may not work during a power outage and the company requires customers to have a mobile phone for emergencies such as calling 9-1-1 when electrical power is not available.

A different company briefly existed under the 'Island Telecom' name when in 1998 the MT&T-controlled company Island Telephone, commonly known as 'IslandTel', was renamed Island Telecom Inc. to reflect the growing diversity of its business areas. It merged with the other Stentor Alliance companies in Atlantic Canada in 1999 to form 3595641 Canada Inc., later renamed Aliant Telecom Inc. / Télécommunications Aliant Inc. (now Bell Aliant), and disappeared entirely by 2001. The company had been founded on April 29, 1929, when the Prince Edward Island Legislature enacted an act to incorporate "The Island Telephone Company Limited", later known as 'Island Telephone'.

An even earlier company "The Telephone Company of Prince Edward Island" was founded in 1885, but suffered severe financial hardship when on September 5, 1911, disaster struck as fire destroyed the company's newly installed switchboard and caused heavy damage to the central office in Charlottetown. By December 1 of 1911 a controlling interest in the company was bought by Nova Scotia-based MT&T. Eastern Telegraph and Telephone Co. became owner of "The Telephone Company of Prince Edward Island" on January 30, 1922, which led to the creation of "The Island Telephone Company Limited" seven years later. In 1998, the original company was renamed Island Telecom Inc. to reflect the growing diversity of its business areas.
