= TCTS (disambiguation) =

TCTS is an English musician

TCTS may also refer to:

- TCTS, Trans Canada Telephone System Telecom Canada
- TCTS, Tata Communications Transformation Services
