= Régie des télécommunications du Québec =

The Régie des télécommunications du Québec (Telecommunications Board) was a quasi-judicial regulatory agency which regulated independent telephone companies (that is, those other than Bell Canada) in Quebec.

It served as the regulator for the independent companies until April 26, 1994, when a decision by the Supreme Court of Canada in the case of Attorney-General of Quebec et al. v. Téléphone Guèvremont Inc. transferred Canada's provincially regulated telephone companies to federal jurisdiction, meaning that they would be regulated by the Canadian Radio-television and Telecommunications Commission.

== See also ==
- International Telecommunication Union
- Inter-American Telecommunication Commission (CITEL)
- List of telecommunications regulatory bodies
