= TPIA =

TPIA may refer to:

- Toronto Pearson International Airport
- Third Party ISP Access
- Take Pride in America
