= Island Telephone Company =

Canadian telephone service provider

- Formerly: Telephone Company of Prince Edward Island
- Founded: 1885
- Headquarters: Charlottetown, Prince Edward Island, Canada

The Island Telephone Company Limited (IslandTel) was a Canadian telephone service provider located in the province of Prince Edward Island, Canada. It operated from 1929 to 1999, when merged into Bell Aliant.

== History ==
IslandTel traces its history to The Telephone Company of Prince Edward Island which was founded in 1885. This company was one of several dozen private independent companies operating in fixed geographic areas in the province. This particular company was largely focused on the Charlottetown area.

=== 20th century ===
In 1910 Halifax, Nova Scotia-based Maritime Telephone and Telegraph Company (MT&T) laid a submarine telephone cable from Wood Islands, Prince Edward Island, to Pictou, Nova Scotia; it entered service on January 1, 1911. The Telephone Company of Prince Edward Island suffered severe financial hardship as a result of a fire on September 5, 1911, that destroyed a newly installed switchboard and caused heavy damage to its central office and headquarters in Charlottetown. By December 1, 1911, a controlling interest in the company was bought by MT&T, thus establishing a partnership of shared telephone communication with Nova Scotia that endures to this day (see Area codes 902 and 782). The company was renamed The Island Telephone Company Limited under a law passed by the Legislative Assembly of Prince Edward Island on April 29, 1929.

The Island Telephone Company Ltd gradually grew through acquisitions of smaller competitors. In 1932, there were 45 privately owned telephone companies in Prince Edward Island. The last independent telephone company merged with The Island Telephone Company Ltd on May 29, 1974, with the purchase of the South New Glasgow Rural Telephone Company.

In the 1980s, the company branded itself as IslandTel. In 1998, the company was renamed Island Telecom Inc. to reflect the growing diversity of its business areas.

==== Merger ====
In 1999 the shareholders of Island Telecom Inc voted to merge with the other Stentor Alliance companies in Atlantic Canada (NBTel, MT&T, and NewTel Communications) to form Aliant Telecom Inc. / Télécommunications Aliant Inc.

The new company is named Bell Aliant.

== See also ==
- Defunct telecommunications companies of Canada
