= Maritime Centre =

Office building in Halifax, Nova Scotia

Coordinates: 44°38′40″N 63°34′19″W

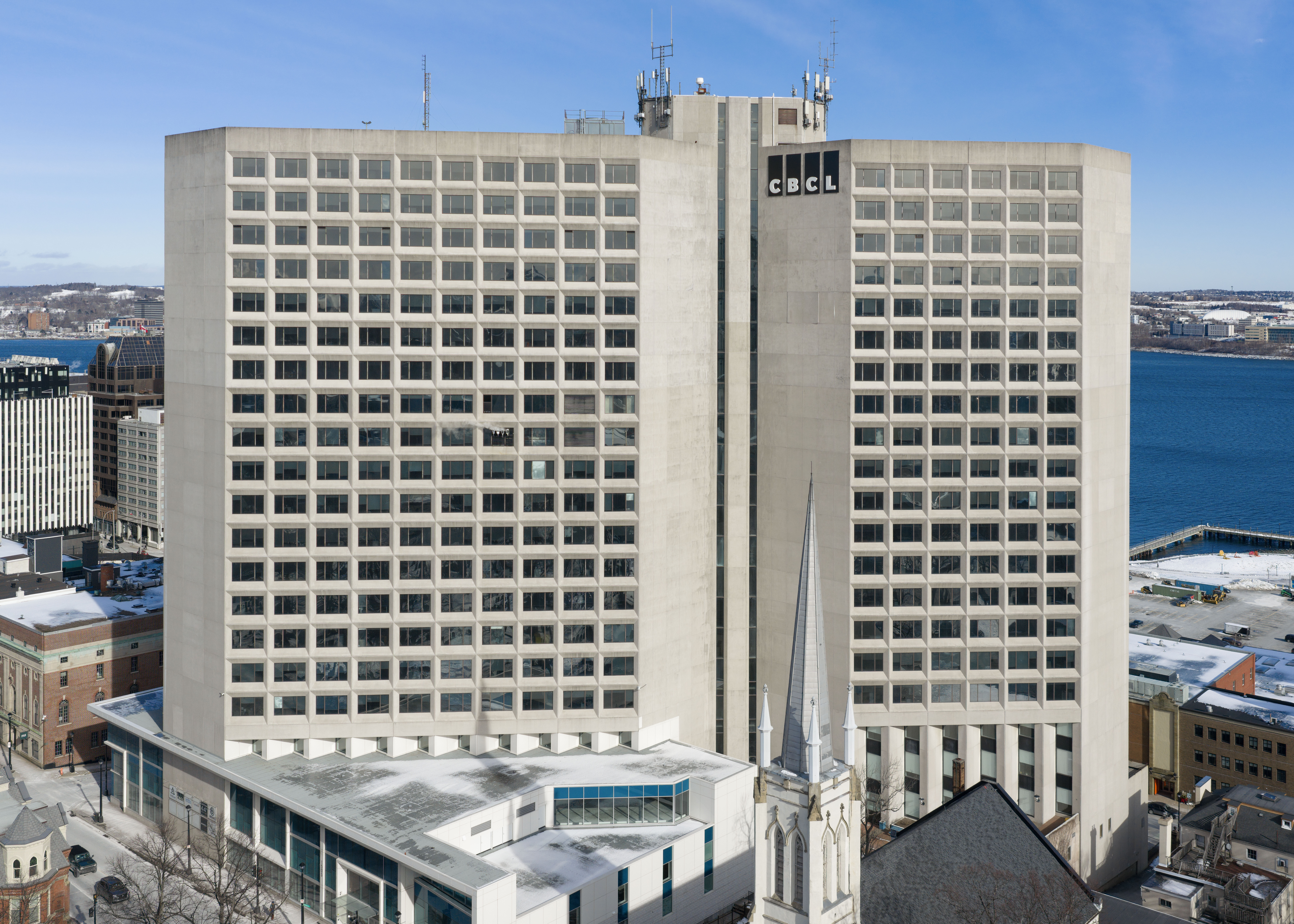
- Southeastern facade
- Interactive map of the Maritime Centre area

General information
- Status: Completed
- Type: Office, retail
- Architectural style: Modernism
- Location: 1505 Barrington Street; Halifax, Nova Scotia
- Construction started: 1974
- Opened: 1977
- Client: MT&T
- Owner: Ravelin Properties REIT

Design and construction
- Architect: Webb Zerafa Menkes Housden
- Developer: Trizec Equities
- Structural engineer: George Brandys & Associates Ltd.
- Main contractor: Robert McAlpine Ltd.

Website
- maritimecentre.ca

The Maritime Centre is an office building in Downtown Halifax, Nova Scotia, Canada, home to the regional telecommunications company Bell Aliant (formerly the Maritime Telegraph and Telephone Company, after which it is named). The main entrance is located at the corner of Barrington Street and Spring Garden Road.

== History ==
=== Planning and construction ===
The project was launched in an effort to consolidate various MT&T departments and offices. In 1972, the company had around 1,100 administrative staff working from over a dozen locations in Halifax. MT&T already owned land at the corner of Spring Garden Road and Barrington Street, and the Capitol Theatre was for sale, allowing the company to enlarge the site.

On 7 November 1973, MT&T announced that they would purchase and demolish the theatre, which was at that time the largest auditorium with a stage in Halifax. A citizen's group called "Save the Capitol Society" was quickly formed. The group tried to ensure that the theatre would be preserved within the redevelopment, but these efforts were to no avail. The theatre was demolished in 1974 to make way for the construction of the present tower.

The Maritime Centre development was announced in May 1974 by MT&T, which would continue to own the land and would be the main tenant of the building, and developer Trizec Equities, whose proposal was selected in a competitive process. Construction was delayed by the discovery of a rock fault beneath the site, which compelled the developers to undertake costly remedial action to protect the adjacent St. Matthew's Church.

The general contractor and project manager for the building's construction was Robert McAlpine Ltd. of Halifax. George Brandys & Associates Ltd. was the structural engineer.

The first phase of the development, comprising a shopping centre, mezzanine and 12 office floors, was opened on 1 August 1977.

=== 1980s expansion ===
Under the agreement with MT&T, Trizec possessed an option to add another seven or eight floors within 8.5 years. A building permit for the addition was issued in June 1982, and construction began later that year. The first phase of the tower had included extra, empty elevator shafts that were put into service with the expansion of the building, estimated in 1982 to cost C$24 million. The same principal consultants that had worked on the first phase of the complex were also employed on the addition project, namely: Webb Zerafa Menkes Housden (architecture firm), George Brandys & Associates (structural engineer), and Robert McAlpine Ltd. (general contractor).

Completed in the summer of 1984, the expansion project added seven storeys to the tower with an additional 176,000 square feet (16,400 m^{2}) of office space, bringing the total leasable area of the building to 622,000 square feet (57,800 m^{2}).

=== Ownership ===
In 1995, Trizec sold the complex, as well as the nearby Centennial Building, to Fortis Properties of St. John's, which paid C$42 million for the two buildings.

On October 13, 2015, Fortis Inc. announced that it had sold its commercial real estate portfolio, including Maritime Centre, to Slate Office REIT. Slate Office REIT was renamed Ravelin Properties REIT on 31 December 2024.

== Design ==
=== Architecture ===
The complex was designed by architects Webb Zerafa Menkes Housden of Toronto and Dumaresq and Byrne of Halifax. Completed in 1977, the original structure had 14 storeys; another seven floors were added in the 1980s. The building stands at 78 metres and has 21 floors, including the two retail levels. It is notable for the strong wind tunnel effect it creates at street level.

According to the building owner, Maritime Centre had 518,970 square feet of gross leasable floor area in late 2025, which was 79.3 per cent occupied.

=== Relationship to viewplane by-law ===
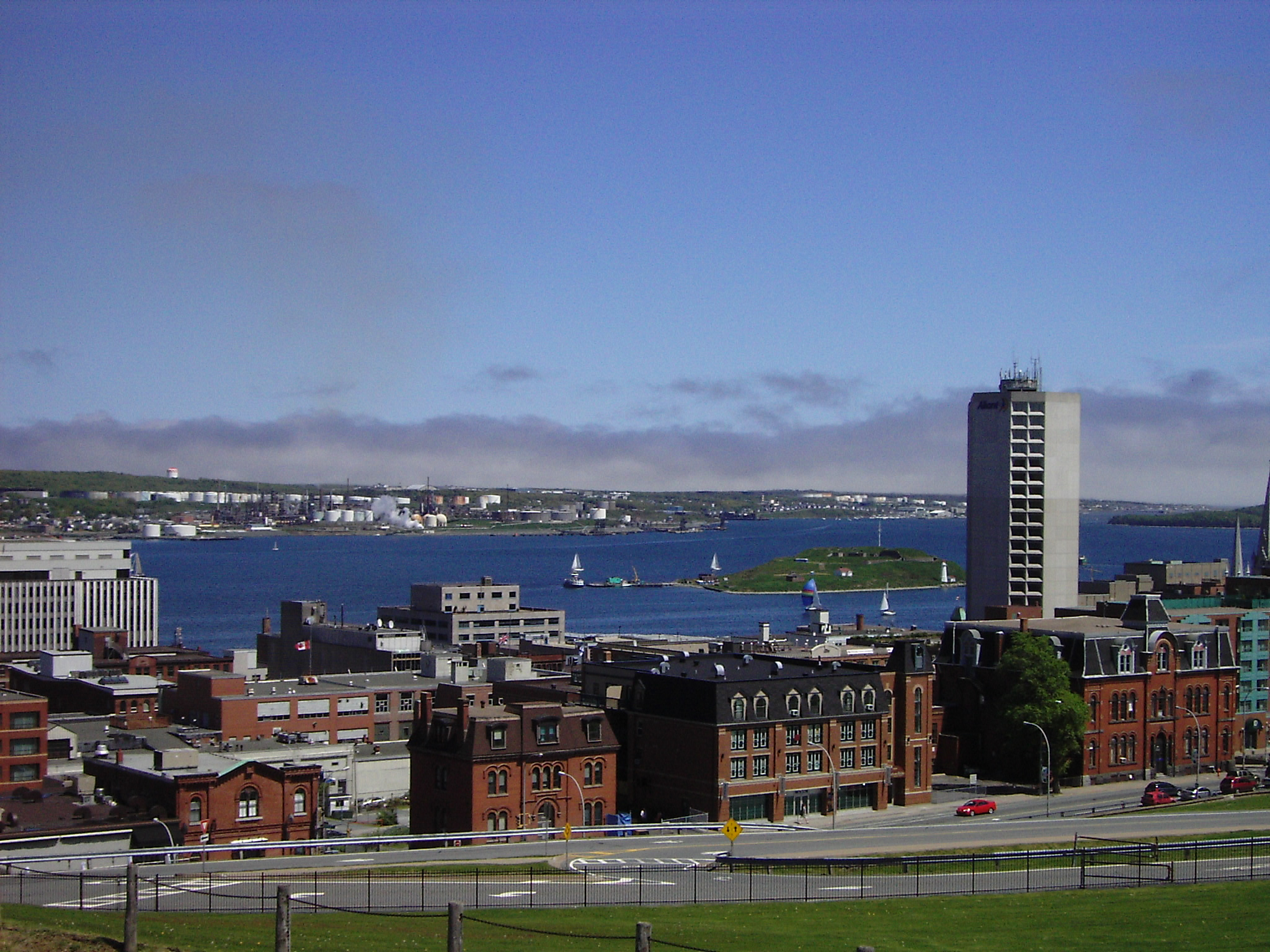
View of Halifax Harbour from Citadel Hill (2007), showing the view of George's Island and one of the narrow ends of the Maritime Centre

Maritime Centre was designed at the same time the former City of Halifax was developing a viewplanes by-law that would protect certain views of Halifax Harbour from Citadel Hill. In November 1973, the president of MT&T, Gordon Archibald, stated that the tower would not block the view of George's Island from the hill. The city also rejected certain candidate viewplanes that would have affected the MT&T project. Halifax council passed the viewplanes by-law in January 1974. Trizec Equities appealed the new by-law on 28 February 1974, which came as a surprise as the project was not thought to clash with the approved viewplanes. Trizec and MT&T argued that a line (delineating the edge of the George's Island viewplane) shown on a map distributed at a public hearing pertaining to the proposed by-law differed slightly compared to a later map showing the approved viewplanes, thereby bringing their building plans into conflict with the new law. This allegation turned out to be true. Halifax council therefore considered the developers to have a legitimate case, and on 14 August 1974, council voted to amend the by-law, slightly reducing the extent of the George's Island viewplane, thereby allowing the Maritime Centre development to proceed.

=== 2022 renovation ===
The lower levels of the building were renovated from late 2019 to 2022. The plazas and steps in front of the building entrances, along Barrington Street, were replaced with expanded lobby, vestibule, and retail areas. The design of the expansion project was intended to improve pedestrian comfort on Barrington Street by breaking up high winds above street level.

== See also ==
- List of tallest buildings in Halifax, Nova Scotia
