= Alliance for Telecommunications Industry Solutions =

- Founded: 1983; 43 years ago
- Type: Professional Association
- Purpose: Information and communications technology
- Location: Washington, D.C., United States
- Region served: Worldwide
- Members: 165 member companies
- President and CEO: Susan M. Miller
- Employees: 21
- Website: www.atis.org

The Alliance for Telecommunications Industry Solutions (ATIS) is a standards organization that develops technical and operational standards and solutions for the ICT industry, headquartered in Washington, D.C. The organization is accredited by the American National Standards Institute (ANSI). It is the North American Organizational Partner for the 3rd Generation Partnership Project (3GPP), a member of and major U.S. contributor to the International Telecommunication Union (ITU), as well as a member of the Inter-American Telecommunication Commission (CITEL).

ATIS has 165 member companies, including various telecommunications service providers, equipment manufacturers, and vendors. The organization encompasses numerous industry committees and fora, which discuss, evaluate, and author guidelines concerning such topics as 5G, illegal robocall mitigation, quantum computing, artificial intelligence-enabled networks, distributed ledger technology, non-terrestrial networks, IoT, cybersecurity, network reliability, technological interoperability, emergency services, billing, the all IP transition, and network functions virtualization.

ATIS is also home to the Next G Alliance (NGA), which is building the foundation for North American leadership in 6G. The NGA is specifically an initiative to advance North American wireless technology leadership over the next decade through private-sector-led efforts. With a strong emphasis on technology commercialization, the NGA's work aims to encompass the full lifecycle of research and development, manufacturing, standardization and market readiness.

ATIS also has a central role in the information and communication technology industry's work to combat unwanted robocalling. Working under the auspices of ATIS, the Secure Telephone Identity Governance Authority (STI-GA) is a critical body helping the industry achieve success in mitigating this problem.
