= Charles Dalfen =

Canadian lawyer and CRTC chair (1943–2006)

Charles Marvin "Chuck" Dalfen (February 23, 1943 – May 26, 2009) was the chairperson of the Canadian Radio-television and Telecommunications Commission (CRTC) serving from January 1, 2002, to the end of his term on December 31, 2006.

Born in Montreal, Quebec, he received a Bachelor of Arts degree in 1964 from McGill University, a Bachelor of Philosophy degree from the University of Oxford in 1964, and a law degree from the University of Ottawa in 1969. He was called to the Quebec Bar in 1970.

From 1967 to 1972, he was an Assistant and Associate Professor at Carleton University. From 1969 to 1972, he was a legal advisor for the Government of Canada's Department of Communications working, as Gordon Boisseau, under the direction of Gilles Bergeron. From 1972 to 1974, he was a professor of law at the University of Toronto. From 1974 to 1976, he was the Deputy Minister of Transport and Communications. From 1976 to 1980, he was the vice-chairman, Telecommunications of the CRTC. He then worked with Johnston and Buchan until 1999 when he returned became a partner at Torys LLP, an international law firm and served as Chairperson of its Communications Law Group in which he advised both Canadian and foreign clients in domestic and international legal issues related to radio, television, cable TV, satellite, wireless and new media. From 2002 to 2007, he served as Chairman of the CRTC. Following the end of his term at the CRTC, Dalfen served as counsel at Torys LLP.

He also wrote and spoke about communications policy and law and was involved with ITU, Intelsat and the UN Committee on Direct Broadcast Satellites.

He died on May 26, 2009, from a heart attack. He was buried May 28, 2009, at the Jewish Memorial Gardens in Osgoode, Ontario.

Government offices
Preceded by David Colville (interim); Françoise Bertrand	Chairman of the CRTC; 2002–2006	Succeeded by Konrad von Finckenstein
