= Françoise Bertrand =

Canadian businesswoman

Françoise Bertrand, OC CQ (French pronunciation: [fʁɑ̃swaz bɛʁtʁɑ̃]; born 1948) is a Canadian business personality. She is the first woman to head a North American television network, as CEO and president of Télé-Québec, and was the first woman to serve as chairperson of the Canadian Radio-television and Telecommunications Commission (CRTC), a position she held from 1996 to 2001. Bertrand was inducted into the National Order of Quebec in 2008 and appointed an Officer of the Order of Canada in 2013. She has served as president and CEO of Fédération des chambres de commerce du Québec (Québec's Federation of Chambers of Commerce) from 2003 to 2016, the first woman to hold the position. She is currently the first woman to serve as Chairperson of the Board of Directors of Via Rail Canada Inc., a position she has held since April 2017.

== Education ==
Born in Montreal, Bertrand holds a sociology degree from the Université de Montréal and a master's in Environmental Studies from Toronto's York University.

== Career ==
From 1980 to 1988, she held many positions at the Université du Québec à Montréal, including dean of resource management. She was then president and CEO of Télé-Québec, becoming the first woman to head a North American television network. Her leadership received praise for "redirecting its educational and cultural programming to reflect the realities of Quebec society".

In 1996, Bertrand became the first, and so far the only, woman to serve as chairperson of the CRTC. During her tenure, the "opening [of] telephone service to competition" took place, as did a major May 1999 decision on "New Media" that gave the CRTC jurisdiction over certain content communicated over the Internet, such as audio and video, but not primarily alphanumeric content such as emails and most webpages. She served as chair until 2001, when David Colville succeeded her as CRTC's interim chair.

From 2003 to 2016, she served as the president and CEO of Fédération des chambres de commerce du Québec, Québec's Federation of Chambers of Commerce, the first woman to do so.

From 2001 to 2018, she served on and chaired numerous boards, including but not limited to Quebecor (chair, 2011-2014), the Commission de la santé et de la sécurité du travail (board member, 2007-2017), and the United Nations Association in Canada (board member, 2016-2018).

In November of 2016, Bertrand became President of the International Board of Directors of Proaction International, and in April of 2017, Chairperson of the Board of Directors of VIA Rail Canada Inc. Today, she is also Vice-Chair of the Board of Governors of Concordia University since 2015 and has served on the Board of Osisko Gold Royalties since 2013.

== Honours and awards ==
Bertrand has received numerous awards and honors, including an honorary degree from Concordia University. Bertrand was granted the insignia of Chevalier of the Legion of Honor in 2001. In 2007, she was named in Canada's Most Powerful Women: Top 100 by Women's Executive Network (RFE). In 2008, she received the insignia of Chevalier of the National Order of Quebec (NQO). In June 2013, she was appointed an Officer of the Order of Canada for "her contributions to corporate governance as an administrator and role model for women".

In November 2019, Francoise Bertrand was awarded the Prix Réalisations (The Achievements Prize) by the Reseau des femmes d’affaires du Québec, a non-profit organization and network of women business professionals “contributing to the leadership, economic development and professional fulfillment of its members”. This prize “pays tribute to a Quebecoise (woman from Quebec) whose exceptional career, compelling achievements, drive and influence both locally and internationally have set her apart in business world”.

Government offices
Preceded by Keith Spicer	Chairperson of the CRTC; 1996-2001	Succeeded by David Colville (interim); Charles Dalfen
