= Ontario Telephone Service Commission =

The Ontario Telephone Service Commission (OTSC) was a quasi-judicial regulatory agency which regulated independent telephone companies (that is, those other than Bell Canada) in Ontario, Canada. It reported to the provincial legislature through the minister of transportation and communications.

It served as the regulator for the independent companies until April 26, 1994, when a decision by the Supreme Court of Canada in the case Téléphone Guevremont Inc. v. Quebec (Régie des télécommunications), [1994] 1 S.C.R. 878 transferred Canada's provincially regulated telephone companies to federal jurisdiction, meaning that they would be regulated by the Canadian Radio-television and Telecommunications Commission.

== See also ==
- List of telecommunications regulatory bodies
