= Konrad von Finckenstein =

Canadian lawyer and public servant

Konrad Graf von Finckenstein CM KC
- Born: 4 April 1945 (age 81); Malchow, Nazi Germany
- Occupation: Public servant

Konrad Winrich Graf Finck von Finckenstein, CM KC (born April 4, 1945) is a Canadian public servant who has worked in the areas of trade, commercial, competition and communications law. He was appointed to the Order of Canada in 2022. He has served since August 2023 as the federal Parliament's Conflict of Interest and Ethics Commissioner.

== Early life ==
Von Finckenstein was born in Germany and immigrated to Canada when he was 17. He received a Bachelor of Arts (with Honours) from Carleton University in 1967, and a Bachelor of Laws from Queen's University in 1971.

== Career ==
In 1973, von Finckenstein entered into the federal public service as a Legal Advisor in the Department of Justice. He would go on to occupy senior roles within the Departments of Justice, Industry and External Affairs.

=== Trade negotiator ===
As Senior General Counsel in the Trade Negotiations Office, he was the chief legal advisor to Simon Reisman during the negotiations that led to the Canada-United States Free Trade Agreement. He played a key role in developing the mechanism to resolve disputes and was in charge of its implementation. A few years later, he oversaw the implementation of the North American Free Trade Agreement.

=== Competition Commissioner ===
In 1997, von Finckenstein was appointed Commissioner of Competition and head of the Competition Bureau, a position he held until 2003. Responsible for ensuring a competitive marketplace for Canadian businesses and consumers, he reviewed proposed mergers in various sectors of the economy and investigated allegations of anti-competitive behaviour.

In 1998, when four of Canada's biggest banks proposed to merge (Bank of Montreal/Royal Bank of Canada and Canadian Imperial Bank of Commerce/Toronto-Dominion Bank), he warned that these transactions would lessen competition and result in the closure of branches and reduced services for Canadians. The following year, he reviewed and approved the merger between Air Canada and Canadian Airlines.

Also in 1998, he led an extensive criminal investigation into schemes designed to fix prices for food and feed additives, such as citric acid. Archer Daniels Midland Company was fined $16 million for its participation in the scheme—at the time, the largest fine ever imposed under the Competition Act—while Haarmann & Reimer Corporation and Jungbunzlauer International A.G. were fined $4.7 million and $2 million, respectively.

In addition to ensuring a competitive marketplace for Canadian businesses and consumers, he led the drive to create of the International Competition Network and served as its Founding Chairman.

=== Federal Court judge ===
As a Justice of the Federal Court from 2003 to 2007, he heard cases involving immigration and refugee law, intellectual property and administrative law. In particular, von Finckenstein held that downloading music tracks over the Internet is not in itself a violation of Canadian copyright law.

He also chaired a NAFTA chapter 19 Extraordinary Challenge Committee on Magnesium Dumping.

=== CRTC Chair ===
In 2007, he was appointed Chairman of the Canadian Radio-television and Telecommunications Commission (CRTC) for a five-year term. He was instrumental in removing unnecessary regulations, allowing the industry to react more quickly to market changes and consumer preferences in an era of rapid technological change.

Under his leadership, the CRTC decided in 2009 to continue to exempt from its regulation broadcasting content that is distributed over the Internet and through mobile devices. In October of that year, the CRTC became the first regulator in the world to establish a net neutrality policy. He also oversaw the transition from analog to digital television, which took place on August 31, 2011. A portion of the spectrum vacated by over-the-air broadcasters has been reserved for public safety and wireless services.

In response to the trend of industry consolidation, von Finckenstein spearheaded the development of a policy to ensure Canadian vertically integrated companies—such as Bell Canada, Rogers Communications, Shaw Communications and Quebecor—contribute to competition, innovation and consumer choice. The policy contains provisions to prevent anti-competitive behaviour, and prohibits companies from offering television content to their wireless subscribers on an exclusive basis.

On November 15, 2011, the CRTC clarified how large telephone and cable companies should be compensated by the independent Internet service providers (ISPs) that access their networks. Independent ISPs require this wholesale access to offer competitive and innovative services to Canadians. The CRTC decided that large companies can adopt a capacity-based model that contains a monthly access rate for each of the independent ISP's retail customers and a monthly capacity charge. They can also charge a flat monthly fee regardless of how much bandwidth the customers of the independent ISPs use. This decision reversed an earlier CRTC ruling on usage-based billing.

==== Usage-based billing controversy ====
Many believed the CRTC's ruling on a proposed usage-based billing model would have put in place protectionist measures for large telecommunications companies such as Bell Canada and Rogers Cable to compete in the Internet market. ISPs claimed that many customers transfer a lot of data through their Internet connections due to the explosion of high-definition video streaming options (e.g. YouTube, Netflix, the websites of TV networks, etc.), which placed a strain on their networks. Experts have argued that this is not a valid reason to implement a pay-as-you-go style system to cover costs as each ISP has enough network infrastructure to handle each customer maximizing their bandwidth rate per second simultaneously, and each gigabyte of bandwidth used per customer has a cost as low as $0.03 CAD according to Teksavvy, a third-party ISP. This regulatory change was very negatively received by the public, as over 460,000 signatures were gathered by OpenMedia.ca, which protested the decision. All three major political parties in Canada spoke out against the ruling. Implementation was delayed by the CRTC, pending further review. As noted above, in November 2011 the CRTC adopted wholesale billing options that gives independent ISPs the flexibility to create their own service plans and set rates for their customers.

=== Ethics Commissioner ===
von Finkenstein was appointed interim Ethics Commissioner by Justin Trudeau on 31 August 2023, and as the six-month position was drawing to a close, Trudeau appointed him to a full seven-year term.

In September 2023 he thought that the ethics laws had a "clear deficiency" because there was no delegation possible in case of incapacity, written into the legislation.

In September 2024 he absolved Randy Boissonnault, the Edmonton-based Employment Minister who ran afoul of suspicions because of a partnership to exploit the COVID-19 phenomenon that pre-dated his entry to Cabinet. The Commissioner found no reason to punish him.

== See also ==
- BMG Canada Inc. v. John Doe

Government offices
Preceded by Charles Dalfen	Chairman of the CRTC; 2007–2012	Succeeded by Leonard Katz (acting); Jean-Pierre Blais
