= Terra Nova Tel =

Defunct Canadian telephone provider

- Industry: Communications
- Defunct: 1988
- Fate: Merged with Newfoundland Telephone
- Successor: NewTel Communications
- Headquarters: Gander, Newfoundland
- Area served: Newfoundland and Labrador
- Parent: Canadian National Telecommunications

Terra Nova Tel was a telephone company providing service on Newfoundland from 1949 to 1988. It was a subsidiary of Canadian National Railways through Canadian National Telecommunications.

In 1930, the government of the Dominion of Newfoundland established the department of Posts and Telephones to provide long-distance connections around the dominion. Only a small number of local telephone services were actually established. In 1949, when the dominion joined Canada as the tenth province, the DPT facilities were transferred to Canadian National Telegraphs, later known as Canadian National Telecommunications. CNT began to develop a more complete network of local telephone exchanges and a long-distance network to link them.

CNT acquired the telephone services of Twillingate Telephone and Electric in 1951. In 1979, CNT created the new entity Terra Nova Tel, with its headquarters in Gander, the largest community served by the company. TNT served most of the island, other than the Avalon Peninsula, the Burin Peninsula, Grand Falls-Windsor, and the southwest area from Corner Brook to Port-aux-Basques, all of which were served by Newfoundland Telephone.

In 1987, CN put its communications companies up for sale, and in late 1988, NewTel, the parent company of Newfoundland Telephone, purchased TNT and renamed it the Central Division of Newfoundland Telephones. The two companies were then operated together as a single entity.
