= Bruncor =

Canadian telecommunications holding company

Bruncor, based in Saint John, New Brunswick was a Canadian telecommunications holding company and the parent company of NBTel. Bruncor merged in 1999 with three other telecommunication companies in Atlantic Canada to form Aliant (now Bell Aliant).

== Acquisitions ==
On Monday, March 22, 1999 a merger agreement is announced which would affect four major Atlantic Canadian companies and their 9,000 employees. The closing date for the merger is set for May 31, 1999.

Under "AtlanticCo" (3595641 Canada Inc.), the four major Atlantic Canada telecommunications companies would merge under one new $3B Communications Company to become the third largest of its type in Canada and one of the largest mobile satellite services in North America.

The merged companies would include:

Maritime Telegraph and Telephone Company Ltd of Nova Scotia (holder of Maritime Tel & Tel Limited, MT&T Mobility Inc., MT&T Leasing Inc. and MT&T Holdings Inc.)

Bruncor Inc., (TSE, ME: BRR) (Including NBTel, NBTel Mobility, MITI Information Technology Inc. (MITI), ImagicTV Inc., New North Media, NBTel Global Inc., and Connectivity Managed Network Services Ltd. )

NewTel Enterprises Ltd. (TSE:NEL) of Newfoundland (Including NewTel Communications, NewTel Mobility, xwave solutions, Stratos Global Corporation, AMI Offshore, and NewTech Instruments)

Island Telecom Inc. of Prince Edward Island (with subsidiary Island Tel Advanced Solutions Inc. (ITAS))

Senior Management of the new Company are named as

Stephen G. Wetmore - President & CEO

Lino Celeste - Chairman

Colin Latham - Telecommunications

Gerald (Gerry) Pond - IT and Emerging Business

Robert (Bob) H. Benson - CFO

William (Bill) H. Steeves - Corporate Services

=== Maritime Internet Services ===
Maritime Internet Services Inc., otherwise known as MIS, was an Internet service provider (ISP) that operated in the Canadian province of New Brunswick. It was founded in October 1994 by four principals, which included Derek Billinglsey, Andrew Chase, Andrew Miller and Donald Trynor. In October 1996, it was acquired by Bruncor, the parent company of NBTel, which operated as the largest telecommunications company in New Brunswick at the time. During the period of its existence, MIS had grown to become the second largest ISP in New Brunswick, with service available in Saint John, Fredericton, Moncton and St. Stephen.

MIS operated several Internet domain names during its existence. These included MI.NET, MIS.NB.CA and MIS.CA. Initially, MIS obtained Internet connectivity from Hookup Communications of Oakville, ON via a 56 kbit/s frame relay connection. This was subsequently upgraded to a 128 kbit/s connection via Insinc then to a T1 connection into the local CA*Net connection in Fredericton, NB, peering with the Educational Computer Network (ECN) and NBTel.

Prior to its subsequent purchase by Bruncor, MIS enjoyed a veritable cult following among its customer base.

=== Partnership ===
Bell Aliant Regional Communications Inc, limited partner 6583458 Canada Inc. and CRTC Broadcast decision.

=== Questions ===
Respondents contest a Plan of Arrangement and ask the "in whose best interest" question.
