= NewTel Communications =

Defunct Canadian telephone and internet provider

- Industry: Communications and Internet Service Provider
- Predecessor: Avalon Telephone Company; Newfoundland Telephone Company
- Defunct: 1999
- Fate: Merged with: Bruncor (parent of NBTel); Island Telecom; MTT
- Successor: Bell Aliant
- Headquarters: St. John's, Newfoundland, Canada
- Area served: Avalon Peninsula; Newfoundland and Labrador
- Parent: NewTel Enterprises

NewTel Communications was a telephone and internet service provider in the Canadian province of Newfoundland and Labrador. Originally known as the Avalon Telephone Company, it served the Avalon Peninsula and later became the Newfoundland Telephone Company and served several additional regions: southwestern Newfoundland between Port-aux-Basques and Corner Brook; part of the Burin Peninsula; Windsor and Grand Falls; and most of Labrador. This was as a result of the acquisition of four smaller companies and their phone services from 1948 to 1962.

On 9 June 1979, it acquired the Labrador Telephone Company serving Labrador City from the Iron Ore Company of Canada and, in late 1988, it acquired Terra Nova Tel from Canadian National Railways, adding other communities on the island including Gander.

In 1985, NewTel Enterprises was formed as Newfoundland Telephone's parent company, allowing the group to diversify. NewTel Cellular (later NewTel Mobility) was formed as a sister company under the NewTel Enterprises umbrella offering mobile phone service. The fixed-line utility continued to operate under the Newfoundland Telephone name until 1996, when it became NewTel Communications.

NewTel Enterprises merged with Bruncor (parent of NBTel), Island Telecom and MTT in 1999 to form Aliant, now known as Bell Aliant.

Newfoundland Telephone corporate family tree
