= Bell Aliant =

Canadian telecommunications company

- Formerly: Aliant Telecom (1999–2008)
- Type: Division
- Industry: Communications Services
- Founded: 1999; 27 years ago
- Headquarters: Halifax, Nova Scotia, Canada
- Products: Fixed line; Fixed Broadband; IPTV
- Parent: Bell Canada (2014–present)
- Website: aliant.bell.ca

Bell Aliant is a brand name used by Bell Canada for telecommunications services in Atlantic Canada.

Prior to 2015, Bell Aliant Inc. (formerly Aliant Inc.) was a separate company providing telecom services in the Atlantic provinces and a few other areas throughout Canada. Bell Canada, which had been the largest shareholder in the company and most of its predecessors throughout their respective histories, took full ownership of Bell Aliant in late 2014. Shortly thereafter, Bell Aliant and its subsidiaries were wound up and their operations absorbed by Bell Canada, which nonetheless continues to use the Bell Aliant brand name in Atlantic Canada.

== History ==
Bell Aliant was the successor to Aliant Inc., formed from the 1999 merger of Maritime Telegraph and Telephone Company (MT&T), Island Telecom (which had been majority-owned by MT&T), Bruncor (parent of NBTel), and NewTel Enterprises (parent of NewTel Communications), then the four main incumbent telephone companies in Nova Scotia, Prince Edward Island, New Brunswick and Newfoundland and Labrador, respectively. Bell Canada was the largest shareholder of MT&T, Bruncor, and NewTel prior to the merger, and received a 53% stake in the merged company, Aliant. At the time that Aliant Inc. was being formed, the executives of the four merging companies agreed to a co-operative management strategy which would see no specific province have a Bell Aliant head office; instead the headquarters functions would be spread across its constituent companies. The telecom operating subsidiaries of each of the merging companies were later amalgamated under the name Aliant Telecom Inc. (later renamed Bell Aliant Regional Communications).

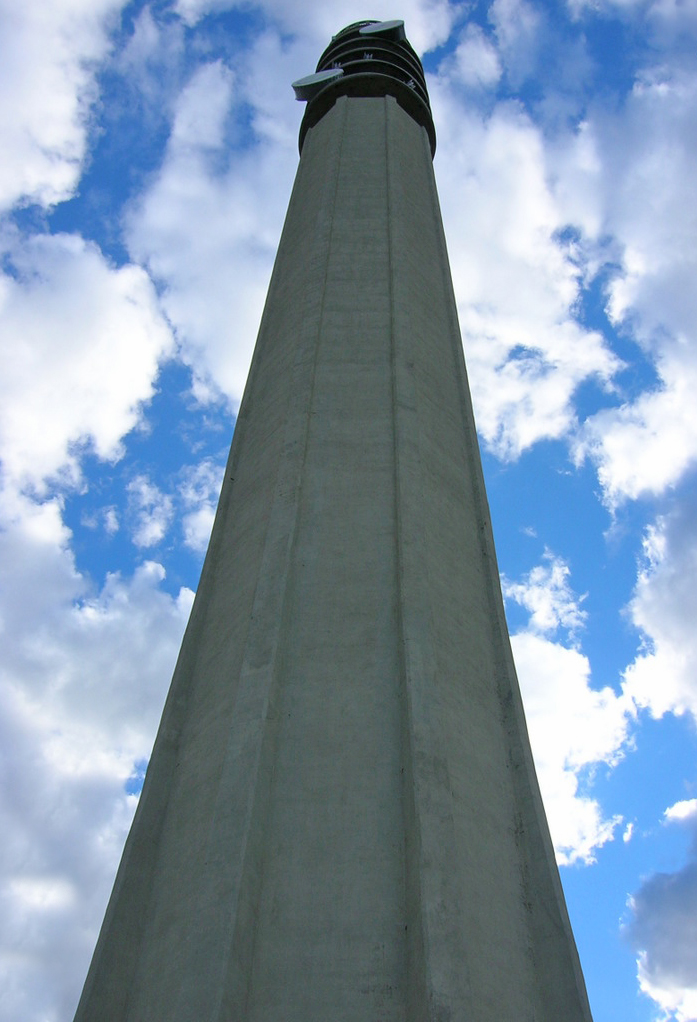
Bell Aliant Tower in Moncton

On April 14, 2006, Bell and Aliant announced plans to merge Aliant's operations into those of Bell. Specifically, Aliant's "high growth" wireless and retail (DownEast) networks would be folded into Bell's wholly owned Bell Mobility and Bell World operations, respectively. Aliant, under a new income trust structure, would acquire Bell's "regional" landline operations (i.e. outside of major city centres) in Ontario and Quebec. This created the significant challenges involved with merging English-speaking operations with French-speaking operations. The transaction was completed on July 10, 2006, and saw the appointment of Stephen Wetmore, formerly of Bell, as president and CEO. Bell Canada retained 45% of the restructured Aliant. Fund units representing about 28.5% of Bell Aliant were distributed to shareholders of Bell's parent company, BCE. Shareholders of the former Aliant Inc. received units representing 26.5% of the firm. (The company would convert back to a regular corporation at the end of 2010.)

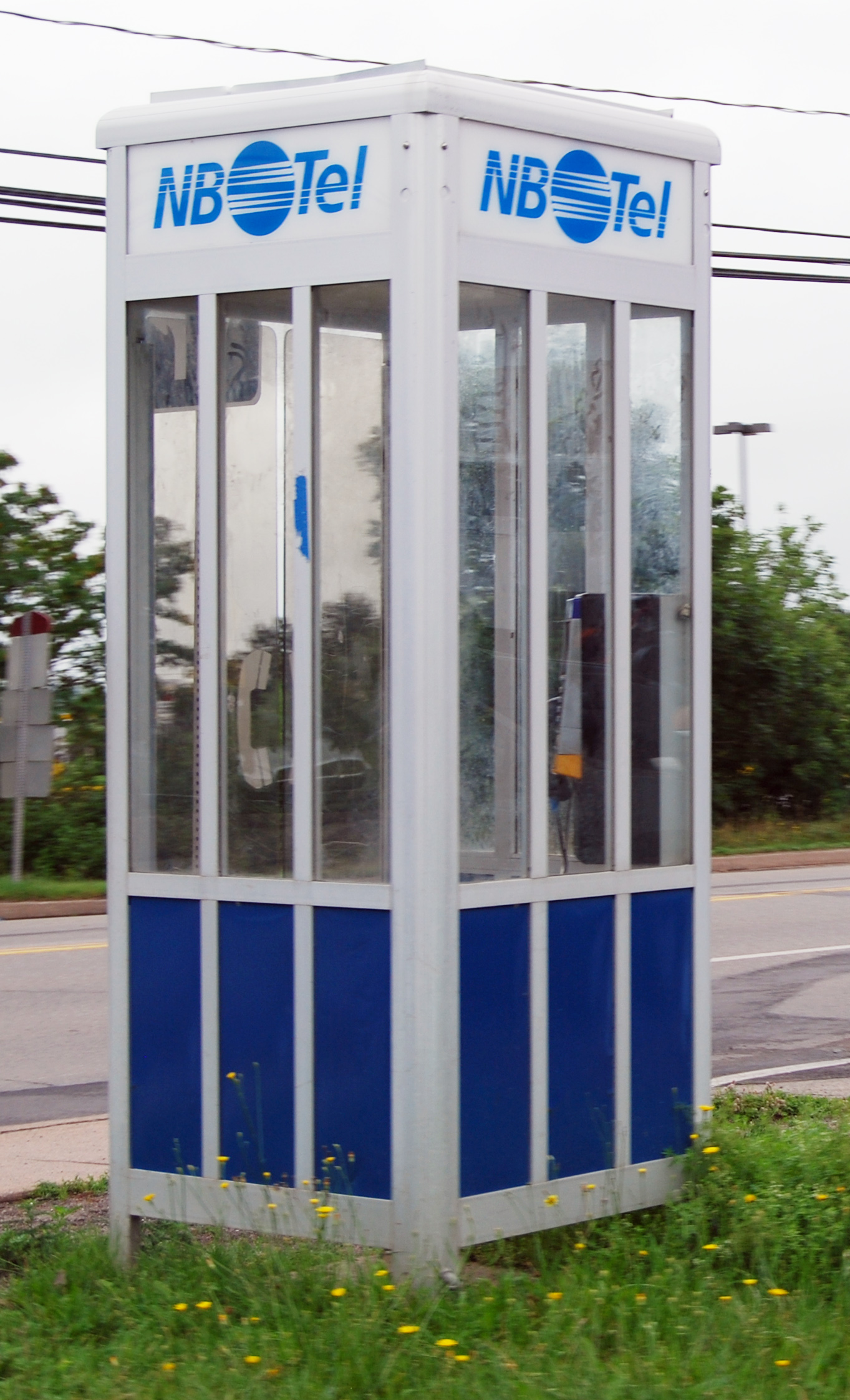
NBTel phone booth

Bell Aliant logo used until August 2008

Aliant logo used prior to the change of name to Bell Aliant

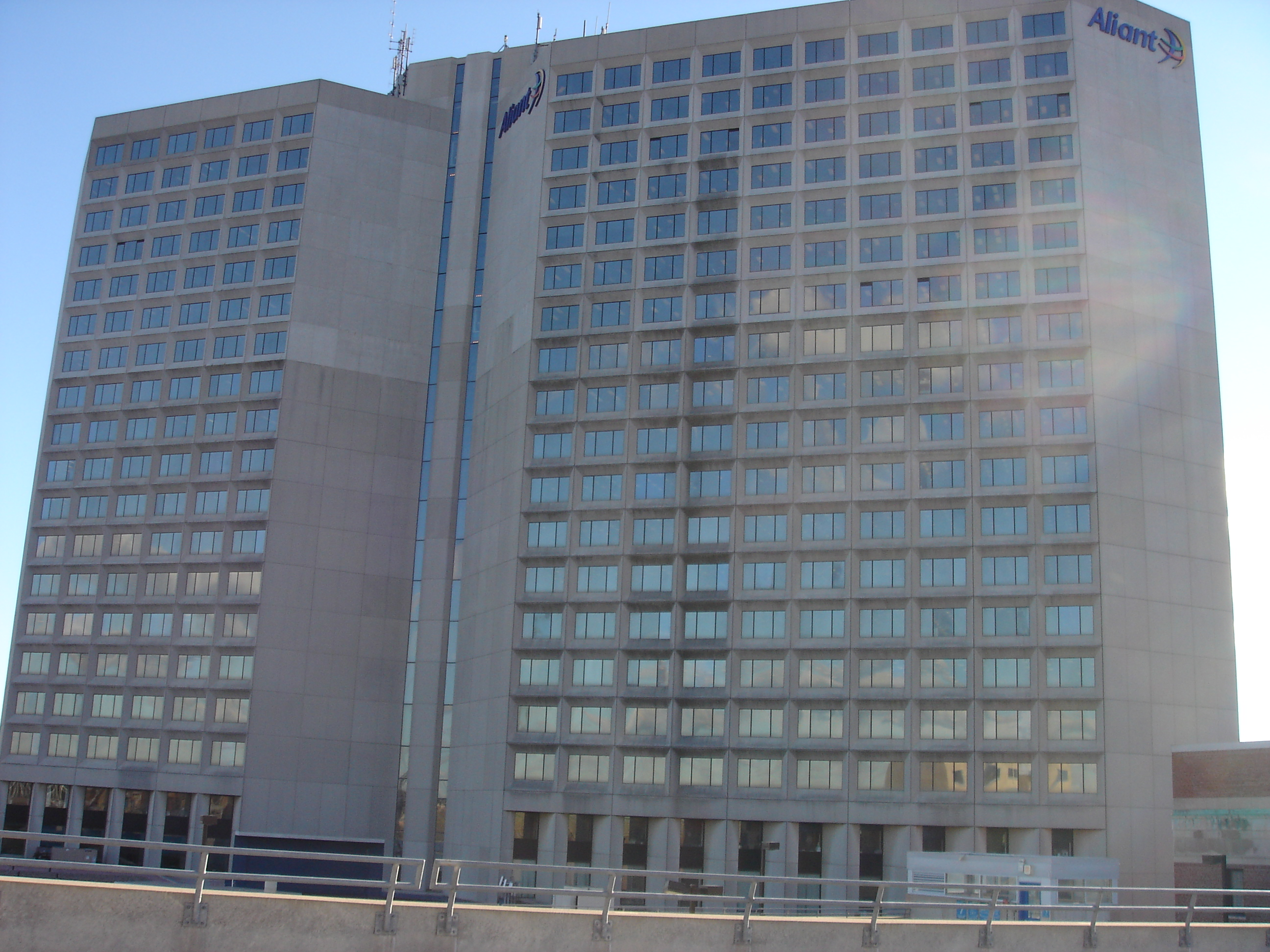
Maritime Centre, Bell Aliant's Former Halifax office

The purpose was to separate out the more stable (or low-growth) parts of Bell's holdings, i.e. wireline operations in markets with relatively little competition, to satisfy investors. The restructuring was not expected to have any effect on end consumers in terms of existing pricing or bundling practices. Meanwhile, Bell Canada proper continues to have full control over its wireless and satellite/cable operations throughout Canada, as well as wireline operations in major centres such as Toronto, Ottawa, Montreal, and surrounding areas.

Bell Aliant has also assumed Bell's 63.4% interests in both NorthernTel and Télébec. Since January 30, 2007, both are 100%-owned by Bell Aliant. Since 2016 they have been considered subsidiaries of BCE as Bell Aliant's operations were consolidated into those of Bell Canada. Both firms continued to operate their own wireless networks until 2015.

On January 1, 2013, Bell Aliant completed its purchase of Dryden Municipal Telephone Service (DMTS), a municipal telephone utility in Dryden, Ontario.

On July 23, 2014, BCE announced it would privatize Bell Aliant by acquiring the interest of Bell Aliant's public minority shareholders. On October 3, 2014, BCE announced the successful completion of its tender offer to purchase all outstanding Bell Aliant publicly held common shares. On November 3, 2014, BCE announced the formal close of the transaction as BCE acquired all remaining Bell Aliant common shares not acquired under BCE's tender offer through a compulsory acquisition effective October 31, 2014. Bell Aliant common shares were de-listed from the Toronto Stock Exchange (TSX) on October 31, 2014.

In October 2014, Bell Aliant completed its acquisition of Ontera, the telecommunications division of the Ontario Northland Transportation Commission (a Crown agency of the Government of Ontario).

== Operations ==
Currently, the company operates as "Bell Aliant" in Atlantic Canada. The Atlantic Canada services were known as simply "Aliant" until summer 2008. Similarly, the former Aliant wireless and retail networks initially operated under the "Aliant" brand in Atlantic Canada, albeit now under the direct control of Bell. Wireless services transitioned to the Bell brand in April 2008.

In Atlantic Canada, Bell Aliant's services include high-speed and dial-up internet access, wireline telephone service, and IPTV cable television. Its main competitors are the region's incumbent cable providers, EastLink (Nova Scotia, Prince Edward Island, and parts of Newfoundland and Labrador) and Rogers Communications (New Brunswick and Newfoundland and Labrador), who had eroded Bell Aliant's market share until mid-2009, and as of 2015, the unrelated Island Telecom, a fibre optic service provider in Prince Edward Island.

In 2009 Bell Aliant launched "FibreOp," now marketed under the common Bell parent product name Fibe; as of mid-2011, the service was available to 294,000 homes and businesses in Atlantic Canada.

Bell Aliant's email service has been excoriated in various media outlets and by customers for service failures and an outdated webmail program. A Google News search reveals some of the problems, which have persisted into 2019.

== Area codes ==
- Area codes 902 and 782
- Area codes 506 and 428
- Area code 709
- Area codes 418 and 581
- Area codes 819 and 873
- Area codes 705 and 249
- Area code 807
- Bell Canada
- Cybertip.ca

== See also ==
- List of internet service providers in Canada
