= Third Party ISP Access =

Third Party Internet Access (TPIA) refers to a Canadian Radio-television and Telecommunications Commission (CRTC) ruling forcing Cable operators (MSO) to offer Internet access to third party resellers.

Examples of TPIAs include netcrawler, TekSavvy, and SimplyNet
