= Maritime Telegraph and Telephone Company =

Telecommunications company in Halifax, Nova Scotia, Canada (1910-1998)

Former MT&T Logo

Last MTT Logo

The Maritime Telegraph and Telephone Company (MT&T, later MTT) was founded around 1910 in Halifax, Nova Scotia and provided telecommunications to Nova Scotia until 1998 when it merged with the Island Telephone Company, NBTel, and NewTel Communications to form Aliant (now Bell Aliant).

MT&T operated most of the telephone exchanges in Nova Scotia, by 1934 they started converting exchanges into an automatic dial system. However by 1966 all of their exchanges in the province that was owned by MT&T had been converted after a push by Bell who was the majority shareholder by that point.

In 1977, MT&T moved into a new headquarters building in downtown Halifax, the Maritime Centre.

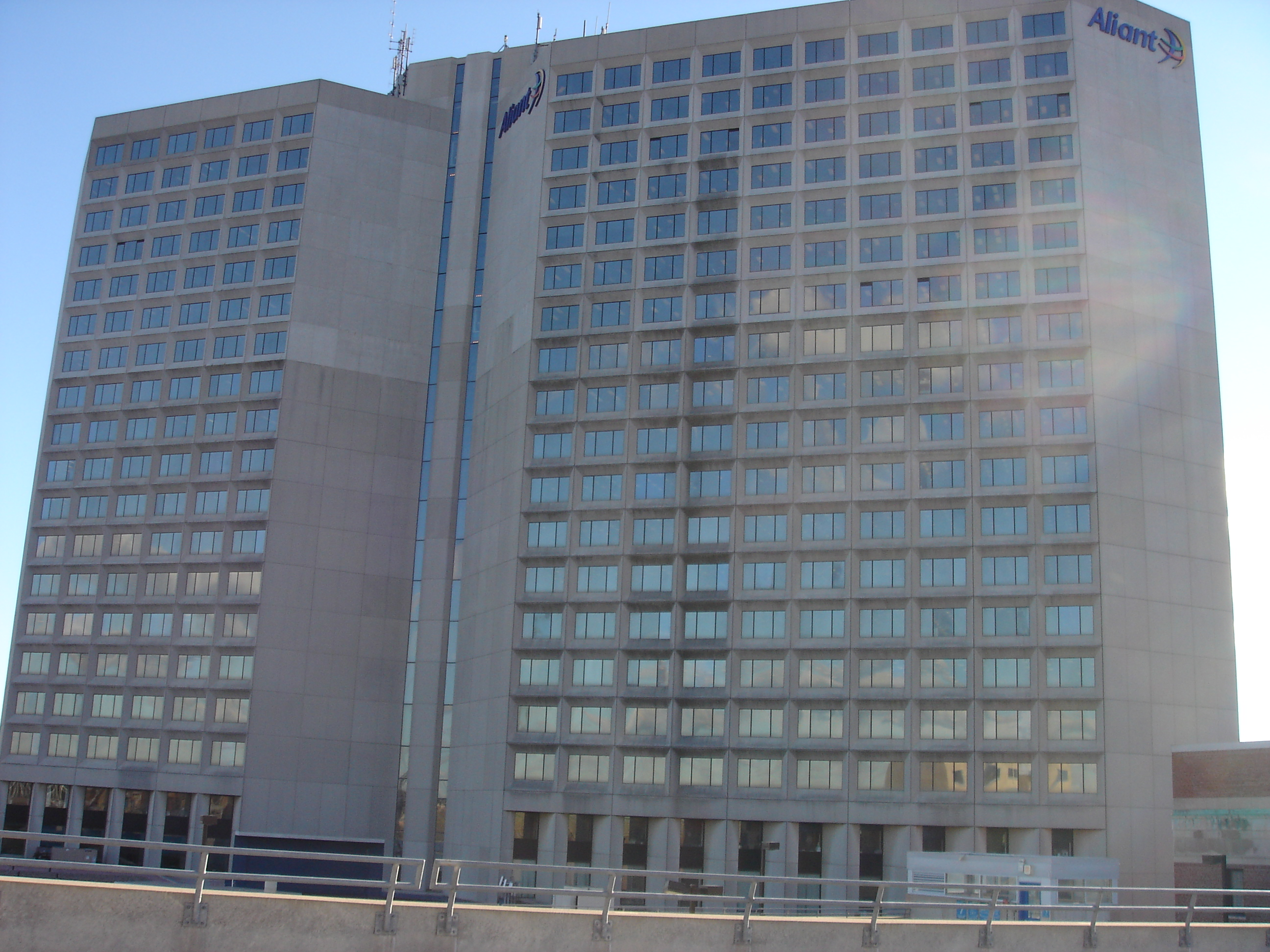
MT&T's former headquarters in downtown Halifax.
