= Télébec =

Telephone company in Quebec, Canada

Télébec LP
- Company type: Subsidiary
- Industry: Communications Services
- Founded: 1969
- Headquarters: Bécancour, Québec, Canada
- Key people: Roch Dubé - President & CEO
- Owner: Bell Aliant, Bell Canada
- Number of employees: 750
- Parent: BCE Inc.
- Website: www.telebec.com

Télébec LP is a telephone company located in Quebec, Canada. It serves various sectors like the James Bay territory area, the Abitibi-Témiscamingue region, parts of central and southern Quebec and parts of the Outaouais region.

Currently, Télébec is the landline carrier for over 180,000 customers spread on about 750,000 square kilometres, making it the telephone company with the largest territory in Quebec.

Télébec is an ADSL Internet service provider (ISP) through Télébec Internet, which is also closely linked with Bell Internet.

== History ==
The name Télébec originated with the first telephone company to operate a municipal system in the town of Bécancour, "Téléphone Bécancour", which was founded in 1965 by a group of businessmen. Three years later, Télébec merged with seven other phone companies: Téléphone Princeville ltée, Télécommunication Richelieu ltée, Téléphone de Contrecoeur ltée, Compagnie de Téléphone La Tuque ltée, Télécommunications de l'Est ltée, Compagnie de Téléphone Arthabaska ltée, and Compagnie de Téléphone Pontiac ltée.

Other telephone companies were sold to Télébec over previous years, with some merged into Télébec.

In 1996 Télébec created Télébec Mobilité, a CDMA and HSPA mobile phone service provider affiliated with Bell Mobility.

=== Bell subsidiary ===
Since January 30, 2007, Télébec is a wholly owned subsidiary of Bell Aliant, although for Inter-Exchange Carrier and Competitive Local Exchange Carrier service agreements it is still considered independent by Bell.

Since 2016 it has been a subsidiary of BCE Inc., after Bell Aliant operations were consolidated into those of Bell Canada.
