= Inter-American Telecommunication Commission =

The Inter-American Telecommunication Commission or Comisión Interamericana de Telecomunicaciones (CITEL) is an entity of the Organization of American States. It was originally created as the Inter-American Electrical Communication Commission at the Fifth International American Conference in May 1923.

Coordination and Advisory:

- CITEL serves as the OAS's leading advisory body on telecommunications/ICT matters in the Americas.
- CITEL's job is to coordinate telecommunications related mandates of the OAS General Assembly and those enacted during the Summits of the Americas.

The commission supports member initiatives to expand telecommunications and information and communication technology (ICT) in rural, unserved, and underserved areas.

In May 2023, CITEL was due to discuss a proposal to repurpose the 10GHz band to 5G.

== See also ==
- Cellular frequencies
- International Telecommunication Union
- Asia-Pacific Telecommunity (APT)
- African Telecommunications Union (ATU)
- European Conference of Postal and Telecommunications Administrations (CEPT)
