= NBTel =

Former Canadian telecommunications company

NB Tel, Inc.
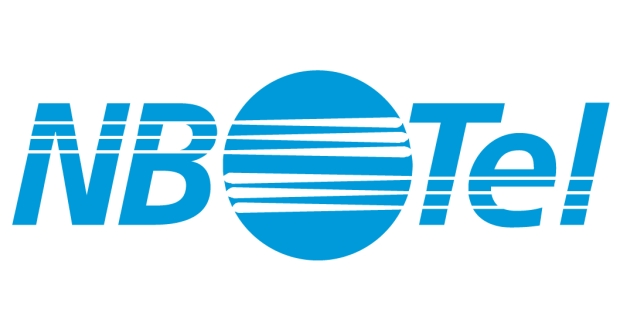
- NBTel Logo used until 2002 when it became a part of Aliant
- Formerly: New Brunswick Telephone Company (1888-1998)
- Industry: Telecommunications
- Predecessor: Dominion Telegraph Company, Western Union, Bell Telephone Company (NB Assets acquired 1889)
- Founded: April 6, 1888; 138 years ago in Saint John, Canada
- Defunct: May 9, 1999
- Fate: Merger
- Successor: Aliant Inc.
- Headquarters: Saint John, N. B., Canada
- Area served: New Brunswick
- Products: Fixed line and mobile telephony Internet services Digital television Radio broadcasting
- Brands: NB Tel, NB Tel Mobility, AIBN, BrunNet, NBNet, iWave
- Revenue: $522.480,000 (1998)
- Operating income: $118,715,000 (1998)
- Net income: $54,766,000 (1998)
- Parent: Bruncor
- Divisions: NB Tel Mobility X Wave
- Website: http://nbtel.nb.ca (defunct)

The New Brunswick Telephone Company, Limited (operating as NBTel) was a telecommunications company that operated in the Canadian province of New Brunswick. The company was founded in 1888 after Bell Telephone Company of Canada's attempt to establish telephone service in the Maritimes failed and purchased Bell Canada's New Brunswick assets in 1889. In 1973, NBTel purchased the last independent telephone operator in New Brunswick, giving it a monopoly for telephone service in the province.

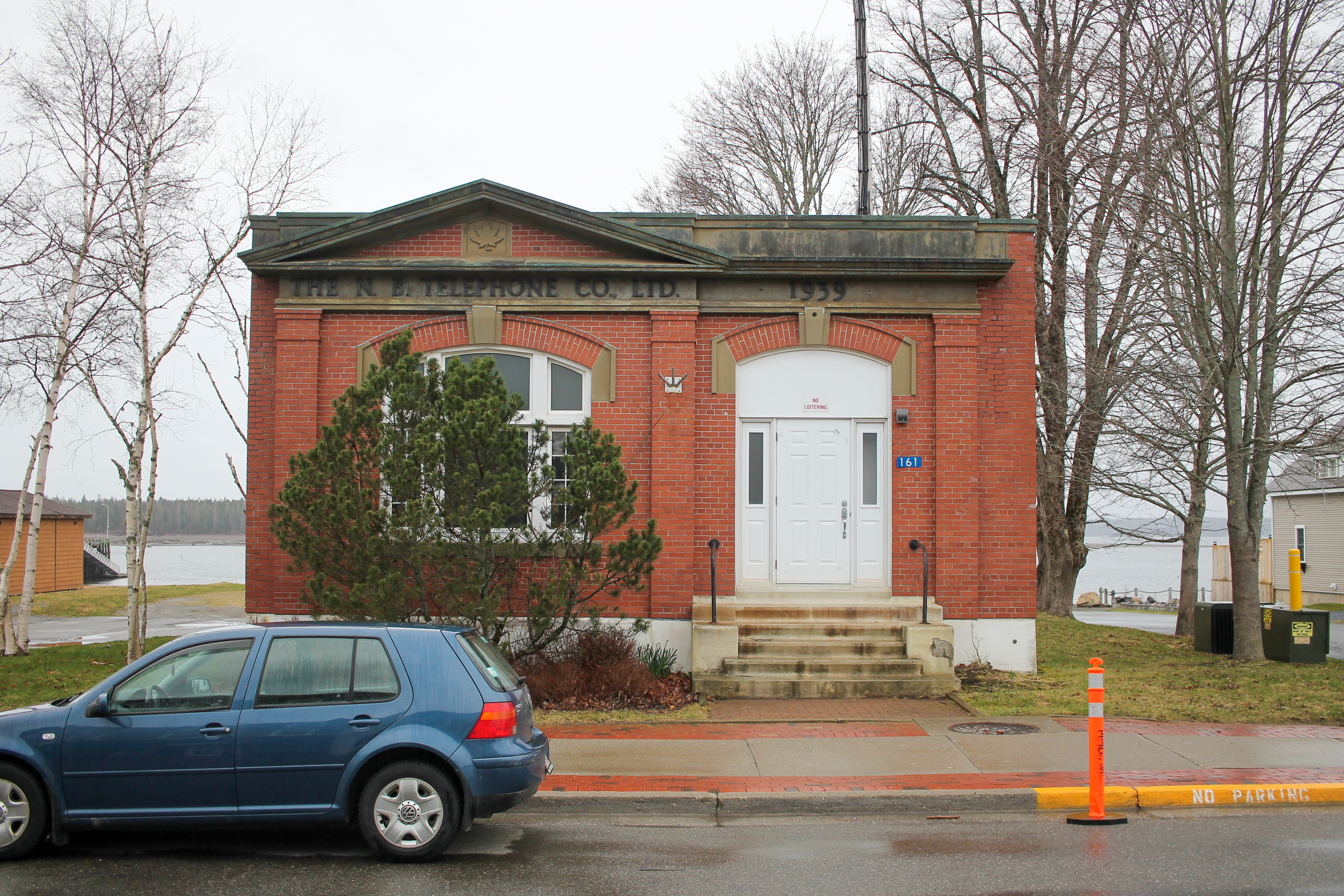
NBTel building in Saint Andrews, New Brunswick.

In 1924, the company built a telephone exchange in Sackville, New Brunswick. An extension was made in 1961 in order to house more equipment. Two years later, the building was sold to the Maritime Conference of the United Church of Canada.

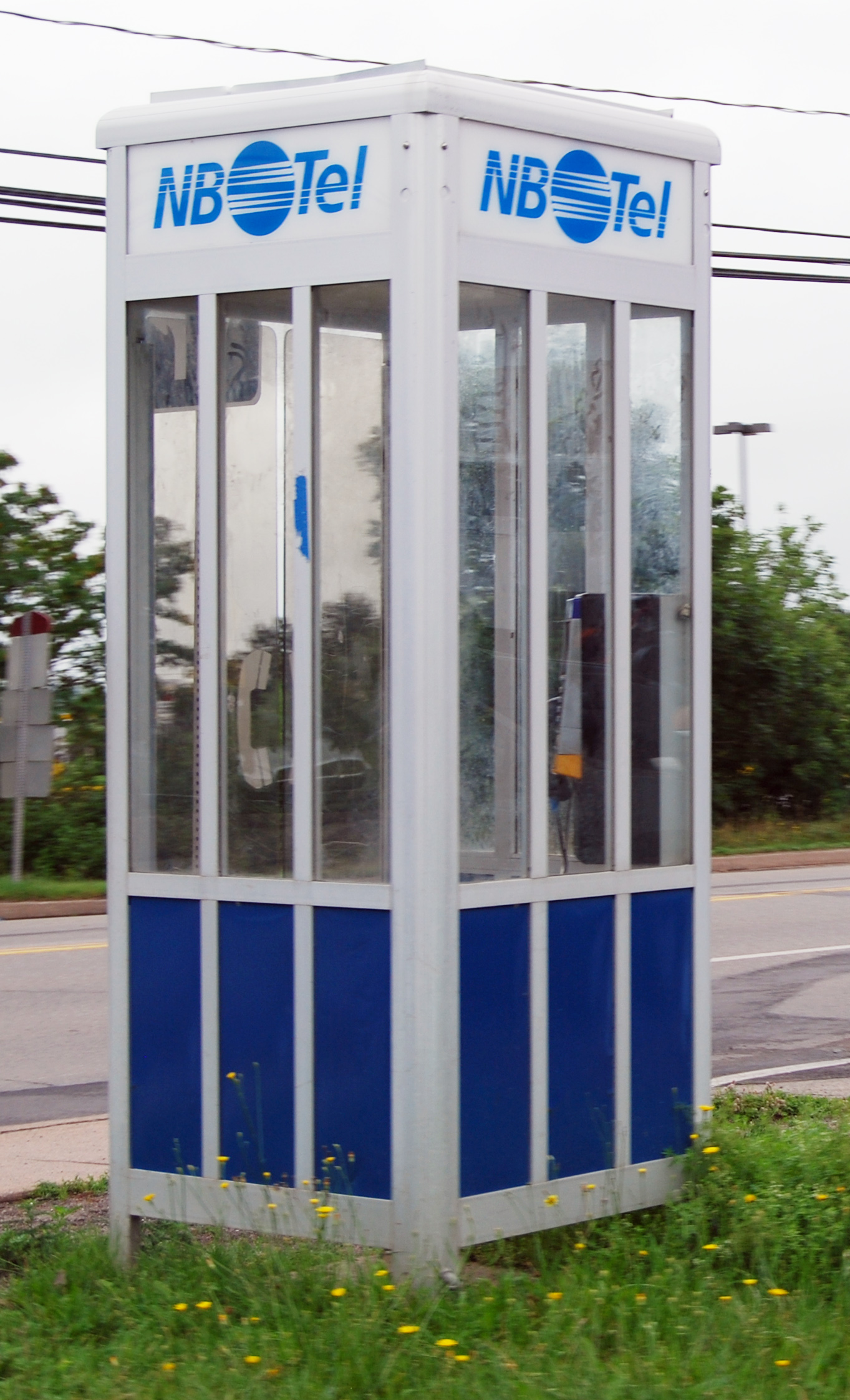
NBTel Phone Booth

Owned by holding company Bruncor, which Bell Canada gained a controlling interest in during the 1960s, NBTel was based in Saint John, New Brunswick, until its merger with the other Stentor Alliance companies in Atlantic Canada to form Aliant in 1999. In 2006, it is now known as Bell Aliant.

== Firsts ==
- NBTel was the first telephone company in Canada to be given Canadian Radio-television and Telecommunications Commission approval to provide television services in 1998 and was the first to launch this into service in 1999.
- NBTel was the first Canadian telephone company to provide internet service.
- In 1993, NBTel became the first telephone company in North America to use a fully digital switching network.
- NBTel was the first company to offer all customers voice mail service.
