= AT&T Technologies =

Holding company created by AT&T in 1983

AT&T Technologies, Inc.
- 1983 logo of AT&T
- Industry: Telecommunications
- Founded: 1983; 43 years ago
- Successor: Lucent Technologies

AT&T Technologies, Inc., was created by AT&T in 1983 in preparation for the breakup of the Bell System, which became effective as of January 1, 1984. It assumed the corporate charter of Western Electric Co., Inc.

== History ==
=== Creation ===
AT&T (originally American Telephone & Telegraph Company), after divesting ownership of the Bell System, restructured its remaining companies into three core units. American Bell, Bell Labs and Western Electric were fully absorbed into AT&T, and divided up as an umbrella of several specifically focused companies held by AT&T Technologies, including:

- AT&T Bell Laboratories - R&D functions
- AT&T Consumer Products - Consumer telephone equipment sales
- AT&T International - International ventures
  - AT&T Network Systems International
  - Goldstar Semiconductor (GSS) a joint venture between Goldstar with 56% and AT&T with 44% joint ownership.
  - AT&T Taiwan
  - AT&T Microelectronica de Espana
  - Lycom
  - AT&T Ricoh
  - AT&T Network Systems Espana
- AT&T Network Systems - Large Business/Corporate equipment
- AT&T Technology Systems - Computer-focused R&D

=== Telephone production ===
From January 1, 1984, until mid-1986, AT&T Technologies continued to manufacture telephones that had been made before 1984 by Western Electric under the Western Electric marking. "Bell System Property - Not For Sale" markings were eliminated from all telephones, replaced with "AT&T" in the plastic housing and "Western Electric" in the metal telephone bases.

Bell logos contained on the bottom of Trimline bases were filled in, leaving a giant lump next to "Western Electric".

==== Telephone changes ====
Toward the end of the Bell System, Western Electric telephones contained much more computer technology and more plastic over metal, since advances in electronics and manufacturing processes made it possible, and there was no longer the need to produce heavy duty, long-lasting telephones. In 1985, the 2220 Trimline was heavily modified, including a touch-tone/pulse dial switch, eliminating the need for the 220 rotary phone, foreshadowing what was to come for other AT&T telephones. The 1985 Trimline, like other new telephones introduced after the AT&T breakup, was marked "AT&T TECHNOLOGIES - MADE IN U.S.A." IC chips, used in these updated "electronic" telephones used WExxx model number nomenclature.

In 1986, AT&T closed the Western Electric Indianapolis Works plant, and Trimline and other residential telephone production was moved overseas. Production of the residential models of the 2500/2554 telephones were shifted overseas as well, both marketed under the "Traditional 100" brand. The 500/554 rotary phones ended production as they were no longer needed. A new Design Line telephone was introduced and produced overseas as well, and many variations of single line telephone sets were manufactured over the years. AT&T Technologies kept the Shreveport Works open, and Princess & 2500/2554 business model production continued in the U.S. Also multiline key telephone systems, such as the Merlin and the Spirit systems were manufactured there. Formerly Shreveport manufactured payphones.

Any phone made overseas by AT&T Technologies no longer had Western Electric markings, except for plugs on modular telephone cords whose clips were marked with "WE" initials. Telephones made overseas by AT&T Technologies were produced in Thailand, Hong Kong, Singapore, and China. Telephones produced at these plants were also marked with "Custom Manufactured in (country) by AT&T"; Chinese made telephones were marked "Custom Manufactured in China for AT&T".

Residential telephone production was shifted back to North America in 1991 when AT&T opened established a subsidiary in Mexico and built a telephone plant. As a result, "WE" markings on modular telephone plugs were replaced with "HHE" or "ECI", marking the end of any Western Electric branding whatsoever on any part of an AT&T telephone. In 1994, AT&T discontinued production of the Princess telephone.

=== Spin-Off ===
AT&T announced in 1995 that it would split into three companies: a manufacturing/R&D company, a computer company, and a services company. NCR, Bell Labs and AT&T Technologies were to be spun off by 1997. In preparation for its spin-off, AT&T Technologies was renamed Lucent Technologies. Lucent was completely spun off from AT&T in 1996.

== See also ==
- Western Electric
- Lucent Technologies
- Advanced American Telephones
- Alcatel-Lucent
