= American Bell =

American Bell refers to two entities that were associated with the Bell System.

- Bell Telephone Company, at one time known as American Bell Telephone Company, original parent of American Telephone and Telegraph Company
- AT&T Information Systems, founded in 1982 as American Bell, Inc., an unregulated subsidiary of American Telephone and Telegraph Company that sold telephone equipment
