= Edward B. Craft =

Edward Beech Craft (born 12 September 1881, Cortland, Ohio – 1929) was an American electrical and communications engineer.

After graduation from high school, Craft was superintendent of the lamp department at the Warren Electric and Speciality Company in Warren, Ohio. He joined the Western Electric Company in 1902 and worked for the company until his death in 1929. He was from 1902 to 1907 an electrical engineer in Chicago in the engineering department. In New York he was from 1907 to 1918 (with interruption by military service in WW I) a development engineer and from 1918 to 1922 assistant chief engineer in charge of development and design. In 1922 he was appointed Western Electric's chief engineer as successor to Frank B. Jewett. Craft was responsible for over 70 patents in electrical communication. In 1925 Craft was appointed Executive Vice President of Bell Telephone Laboratories. He worked with Edwin H. Colpitts, Harold D. Arnold, and Frank B. Jewett.

During WW I in the U.S. Army Signal Corps, Craft was a captain from March 1917 to December 1917 and a major from March 1917 to May 1918. From June 1918 to October 1918 he was a technical advisor on radio communication to the U.S. Navy in London, UK.

From about 1920 Craft worked on sound film. Under his leadership, a team headed by I. B. Crandall developed sound-on-film and another team headed by J. P. Maxfield developed sound-on-disc. On 27 October 1926, Craft presented to the New York Society of Electrical Engineers the sound film The Voice from the Screen starring the vaudeville duo Witt & Berg. The following year The Jazz Singer premiered.

By 1928 the sound film equipment developed under Craft's direction had overwhelming dominance among the Hollywood studios.

On 21 October 1902 in Ironton, Ohio, he married Mary R. Richards. They had one daughter, Clara Virginia Craft (born 1908).

== Selected publications ==
- The Bell system research laboratories; 1924
- Airways Communication Service, Bell Systems Technical Journal, vol. 7: no. 4 October 1928, pp. 797–807.
