= Advanced American Telephones =

Telephone manufacturing company

VTech Innovation, L.P.
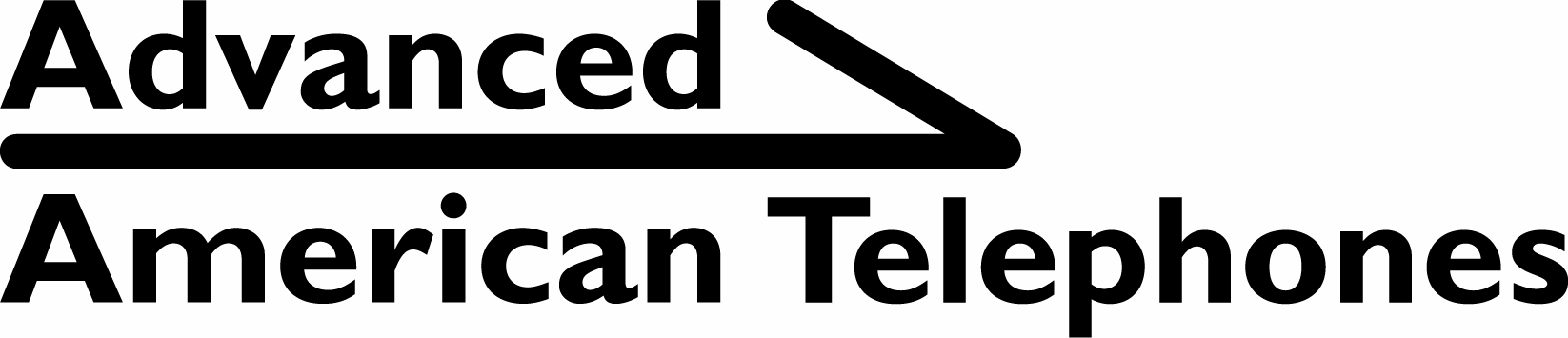
- Formerly: Lucent Technologies Consumer Products, L.P. (1996-2000)
- Company type: Subsidiary
- Industry: Customer Premises Equipment
- Founded: 2000; 26 years ago
- Key people: Kent Wong Wah Shun (vice president and general manager)
- Products: AT&T branded telephones
- Brands: Advanced American Telephones
- Parent: AT&T Technologies (1982-1996); Lucent (1996-2000); VTech (2000-present)
- Website: telephones.att.com

VTech Innovation, L.P., doing business as Advanced American Telephones, is a telephone manufacturing company.

== History ==
American Bell Consumer Products was created on January 1, 1983, as a unit of American Bell, Inc., upon declaration by the Modification of Final Judgment that American Telephone & Telegraph (AT&T) had to sell equipment to the public through an entirely separate subsidiary. American Bell Consumer Products sold terminal equipment traditionally available through the Bell System, such as the Trimline telephone. American Bell products could be found at Bell PhoneCenter Stores, as well as department stores such as Sears and Target. American Bell products were not marked with any Bell name, but simply marked "Western Electric" and the Bell logo, as any products sold through American Bell were not "Bell System Property".

Upon the divestiture of the Bell Operating Companies from AT&T, American Bell was renamed AT&T Information Systems, American Bell Consumer Products was renamed AT&T Consumer Products and Bell PhoneCenters were renamed AT&T PhoneCenters. Bell and Western Electric markings were replaced with AT&T on telephone housings. AT&T Consumer Products became responsible for leased telephones and manufactured telephones on January 1, 1984. AT&T Consumer Products was absorbed into AT&T Technologies in 1989. AT&T Consumer Products ceased operations of AT&T Phone Centers in 1995, deciding to simply focus on leasing equipment and on sales at department stores. It, along with the rest of AT&T Technologies and Bell Laboratories, became a part of Lucent Technologies in 1996, following completion of its spinoff from AT&T.

Lucent Technologies Consumer Products, L.P. (LTCP) became the new name of AT&T Consumer Products in 1996. Its operations remained largely unchanged from its operations at AT&T. In 1997, LTCP was placed in the unsuccessful Philips Consumer Communications joint venture. LTCP was retained after the venture failed.

In 2000, Lucent opted to reorganize its equipment units, spinning off its Networks Systems unit as Avaya, and selling off its Consumer Products unit. Its telephone leasing operation was sold to Consumer Phone Services, and its consumer telephone manufacturing division was purchased by VTech on April 2, 2000.

== Today ==
Renamed VTech Innovation, L.P., the former LTCP manufacturing division does business as Advanced American Telephones. Telephone production was abruptly shifted to China. Advanced American Telephones also entered a 20 licensing agreement with AT&T to use the AT&T brand on all telephones it would produce. In addition, Advanced American Telephones manufactured phones serve as a portrayal of AT&T's home phone service and are seen in ads for it.

Phones made today by Advanced American Telephones primarily include cordless telephones and some corded phones, such as Trimline, and some multi-line desk phones. Advanced American Telephones also holds the trademark rights to the Trimline and Design Line names, as well as others. They also produce answering machines.
