= Point de Bute, New Brunswick =

Coordinates: 45.89938°N 64.24311°W

Location of Point de Bute in New Brunswick

Point de Bute or Pointe de Bute is an area in ward five of the town of Tantramar in Westmorland County, New Brunswick, Canada.

The former local service district of Pointe de Bute took its name from the community but used a different spelling.

== History ==
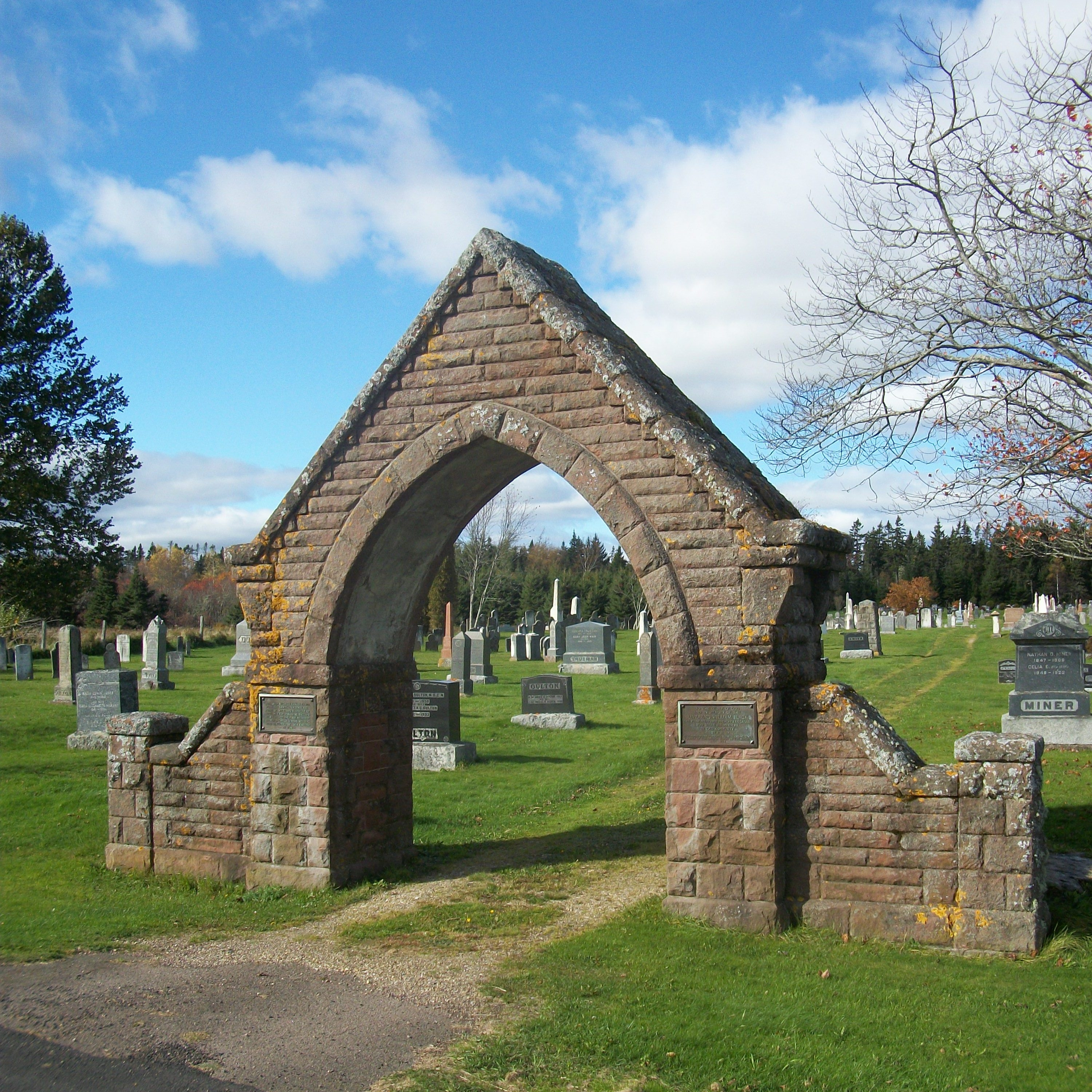
Cemetery in Point de Bute near where the first Methodist church stood and where William Black would have preached.

The Acadian Pierre Buhot settled here in the late 1600s, and the original name was Pont à Buhot which evolved, via Pont à Buot to the current name. Opposite his house was a bridge over the Missaguash River, leading to the Tantramar Marsh. It was near the outlet of a stream, Rivière à l'Ours and a redoubt, which was the first point of attack by Monckton's army in 1755 as it advanced from Fort Lawrence to cross the Missaguash river on the way to attack Fort Beausejour.

== Demographics ==
In the 2021 Census of Population conducted by Statistics Canada, Pointe de Bute had a population of 561 living in 226 of its 253 total private dwellings, a change of −1.8% from its 2016 population of 571. With a land area of 80.17 km^{2} (30.95 sq mi), it had a population density of 7.0/km^{2} (18.1/sq mi) in 2021.

== Notable people ==
- Point de Bute is the birthplace of the British Columbian transportation pioneer Stephen Tingley,
- birth place of World War I flying ace Albert Desbrisay Carter, and the scientist Edwin Colpitts.
- home of Thomas Dixson

== See also ==
- List of communities in New Brunswick
