= Otto B. Blackwell =

American electrical engineer (1884–1970)

- Born: August 21, 1884; Bourne, Massachusetts, U.S.
- Died: November 21, 1970 (aged 86); Sands Point, New York, U.S.
- Awards: IEEE Edison Medal (1950)

Otto Bernard Blackwell (August 21, 1884 – November 21, 1970) was an American electrical engineer known for his pioneer contributions to the art of telephone transmission. He received the IEEE Edison Medal in 1950. Mr. Blackwell held about two dozen patents in the telephone field.

He received a B.S. in electrical engineering from the Massachusetts Institute of Technology in 1906, and joined the engineering department of American Telephone and Telegraph. He worked in the Engineering Dept of ATT from 1906 to 1914, was a Transmission and Protection Engineer 1914-1919 a Transmission and Development Engineer 1919-1934.

Edwin H. Colpitts and Otto B. Blackwell published an important paper on carrier multiplex telephony and telegraphy in the Transactions of the AIEE in 1921. They summarized work on bandpass filters and vacuum-tube electronics, which had enabled a four-channel commercial system to be placed in operation between Baltimore, MD, and Pittsburgh, PA, in 1918.

He became vice president of Bell Laboratories, and at retirement in 1949 he was an assistant vice president at American Telephone and Telegraph the parent company.

Otto B. Blackwell son of Edwin A Blackwell and Abbie (Walker) Blackwell was born in Bourne, Massachusetts; married Elsie Eldredge July 2, 1917 in Brooklyn, N.Y., and had a son Edwin Alston Blackwell and a daughter, Mrs. Anna Louise Wood of Plandome, New York, and three grandchildren.
