= Harold D. Arnold =

American electronics engineer (1883–1933)

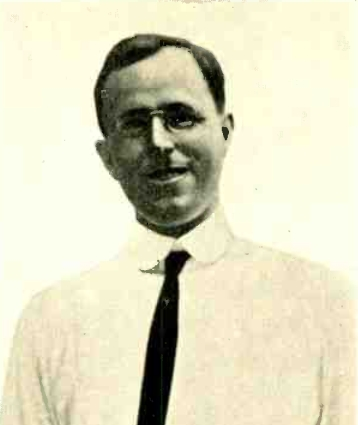
Harold D. Arnold c. 1915 at Arlington

Harold DeForest Arnold (September 3, 1883 – July 10, 1933) was an electronics engineer and pioneer of radio communication and telephony. He served as the first director of research at Bell Telephone Laboratories from 1925 to his death.

== Life and work ==
Arnold was born in Woodstock, Connecticut, to Calvin Arnold and Audra Allen. He studied at Wesleyan University for his BS and MS and then studied physics at the University of Chicago for his PhD. He initially studied under Albert A. Michelson but when he confided to Robert Andrews Millikan that he would probably have to commit suicide as he could not meet Michelson's requirement, Millikan took Arnold over as his own student. When Frank B. Jewett was looking for someone to work on repeaters for transcontinental telephony, Arnold was suggested by Millikan. Arnold worked at the University of Chicago from 1907 to 1909 and served as a professor at Mount Allison University, from 1909 to 1910 and then at University of Chicago (1910).

In 1911 he joined the Western Electric Company under Edwin H. Colpitts. His earliest work was in the development of a vacuum-tube based amplifiers beginning with improvements to Lee de Forest's triode “audion”. He worked on innovations that made it possible to demonstrate the first radio transmission between Arlington, Virginia, and Paris, France, in October 1915. During World War I he served as a captain in the signal corps. He developed and refined manufacturing techniques for vacuum tubes, oxide coatings for filaments, and other innovations for reliability and ease of replacement. Permalloy and Perminvar were developed by his team and this helped improve signal quality in undersea cables. Arnold received the John Scott Medal in 1928.

Arnold was one of the founders, along with other renowned acousticians, of the Acoustical Society of America (ASA), on December 27, 1928 at the Bell headquarters in New York City.

One of his last projects was in the transmission of high quality sound, with the collaboration of Leopold Stokowski, conductor at the Philadelphia Orchestra that resulted in a live broadcast of a concert at Constitution Hall over telephone in April 1933.

Arnold married Leila Berman in 1908 and they had two daughters. He died from a heart attack at his home in Summit, New Jersey.
