= Edwin H. Colpitts =

Canadian engineer (1872–1949)

- Born: January 19, 1872; Westmorland County, New Brunswick, Canada
- Died: March 6, 1949 (aged 77); Orange, New Jersey, United States
- Citizenship: United States–Canadian
- Education: Mount Allison University; Harvard University
- Known for: Colpitts oscillator
- Awards: Elliott Cresson Medal (1948)
- Scientific career
- Fields: Electronic engineer
- Workplaces: Western Electric; Bell Labs; US Army Signal Corps
- Academic advisors: John Trowbridge

Edwin Henry Colpitts (January 19, 1872 – March 6, 1949) was a communications pioneer best known for his invention of the Colpitts oscillator. As research branch chief for Western Electric in the early 1900s, he and scientists under his direction achieved significant advances in the development of oscillators and vacuum tube push–pull amplifiers. In 1915, his team successfully demonstrated the first transatlantic radio telephone. Colpitts died at home in 1949 in Orange, New Jersey, United States and his body was interred in Point de Bute, New Brunswick, Canada. He had a wife, Grace Penney Colpitts, and a son, Donald B. Colpitts.

== Education and career ==
Born in Point de Bute, New Brunswick, he began his education at Mount Allison University and was later a teacher and school principal in Newfoundland. In 1895 he entered Harvard University where he studied physics and mathematics. He received a BA in 1896 and a Master's degree in 1897 from that institution. He remained at Harvard for two additional years while taking advanced courses and serving as a laboratory assistant to John Trowbridge, director of the Jefferson Physical Laboratory. In 1899, Colpitts accepted a position with American Bell Telephone Company. He moved to Western Electric in 1907. His Western Electric colleague, Ralph Hartley invented an inductive coupling oscillator in 1915, and Colpitts invented its electrical dual using capacitors in 1918 (the Colpitts oscillator). It was first reported a paper he published, with Edward B. Craft, in 1919. He patented it as the "Oscillation Generator" in 1920. Colpitts and Craft wrote that "the possibility of communication by speech between any two individuals in the civilized world is one of the most desirable ends for which engineering can strive."

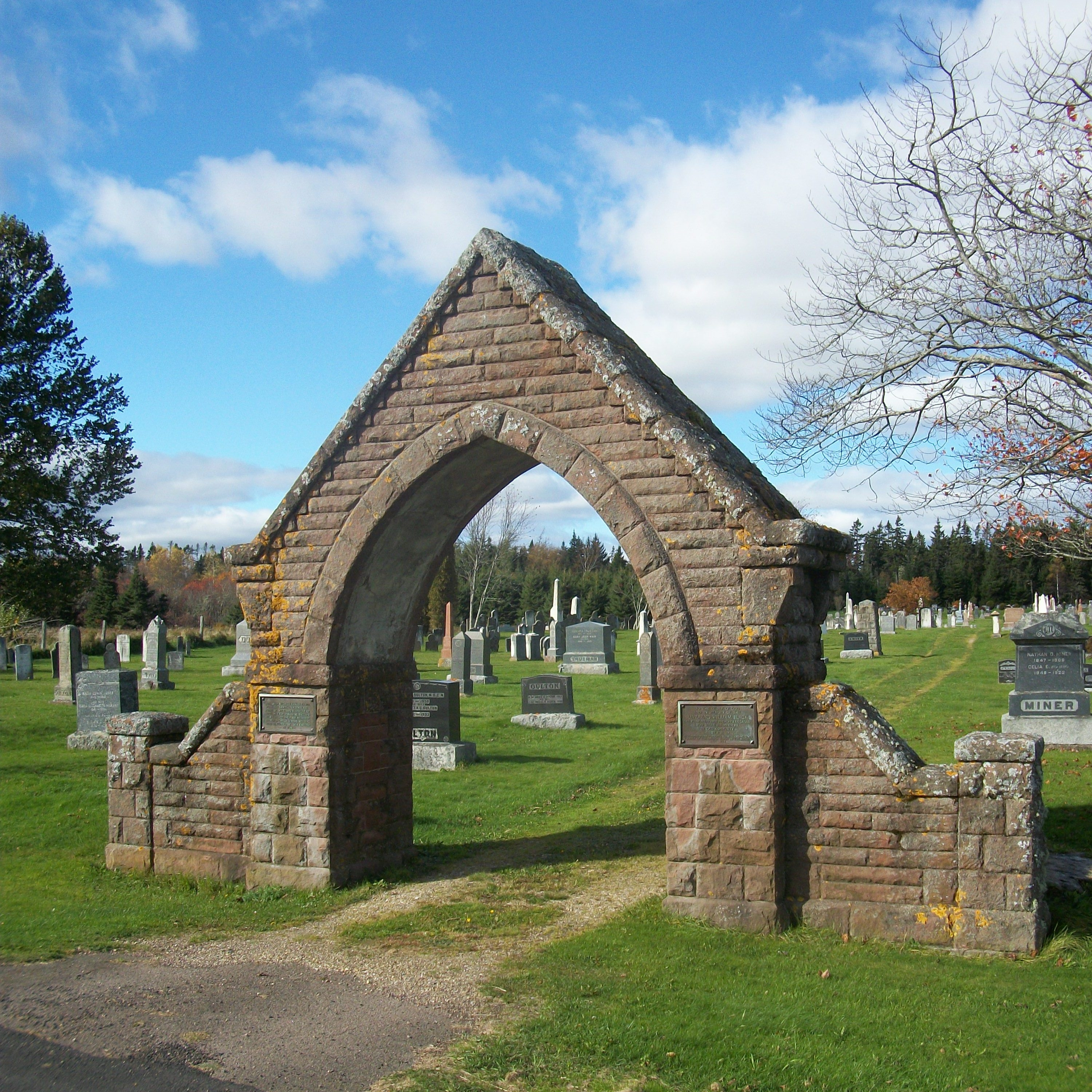
Cemetery in Point de Bute, New Brunswick, where Colpitts is buried.

Colpitts served in the US Army Signal Corps during World War I and spent some time in France as a staff officer involved with military communication.

Colpitts and Otto B. Blackwell published an important paper on carrier multiplex telephony and telegraphy in the Transactions of the AIEE in 1921. They summarized work on bandpass filters and vacuum-tube electronics, which had enabled a four-channel commercial system to be placed in operation between Baltimore, MD, and Pittsburgh, PA, in 1918.

Western Electric research laboratories became part of Bell Laboratories in 1925. Colpitts reached the position of vice-president of Bell Labs before retirement.

In 1940, Colpitts was called out of retirement to head a committee reviewing the state of sonar development in the United States Navy. The committee report identified critical limitations of American sonar compared with German developments, which spurred American fundamental sonar research.

He was awarded the Elliott Cresson Medal in 1948.
