= AT&T Information Systems =

- Formerly: American Bell
- Type: Subsidiary
- Industry: Computers, telecommunications
- Founded: 1983; 43 years ago
- Defunct: 1989; 37 years ago
- Fate: Merged into AT&T Corporation, Partially succeeded by USL
- Successor: Unix System Laboratories
- Parent: AT&T Corporation

AT&T Information Systems (ATTIS), originally known as American Bell, was the fully separate subsidiary of American Telephone & Telegraph Company (AT&T) which focused on computer technology ventures and telephone sales, and other unregulated business. It was one of the three core units of AT&T formed after the breakup of the Bell System. As a twenty-five percent owner, AT&T Information Systems utilized production of Olivetti to manufacture their AT&T PC 6300 series of computers. Along with the 3B series computers and the AT&T UNIX PC the PC 6300 series of computers represented a multi-faceted strategy of competing with IBM, who was the leading computer manufacturer of the time.

== History ==
American Bell logo used from 1982 to 1984, with 20-bar globe.

After the breakup of the Bell System, which became effective in January 1984, AT&T Corporation—the world's largest company—was allowed to enter the computer market. In 1979 and 1980, the Federal Communications Commission (FCC) conducted Computer Inquiry I and II, which restricted Western Electric from selling "enhanced services", such as telephone equipment and other unregulated business, except through a fully separated AT&T subsidiary. As a result, American Bell, Inc. was formed, and began operations in 1982.

Observers expected American Bell, with Bell Labs and Western Electric, to challenge market leader IBM, and saw its first 3B series computers in March 1984 as the most important products in the industry since the IBM PC in 1981. AT&T, they thought, had the technology to become an important computer company, while its large size would reassure customers that its products would not become orphaned technology. Employees at American Bell who worked in AT&T facilities that housed Bell Labs and Western Electric offices often encountered bureaucratic red tape, such as restrictions on using the one library in the same building because it was owned by Bell Labs.

American Bell contained two core units:

- American Bell Consumer Products - sold residential telephones/terminal equipment
- American Bell Advanced Information Systems - sold business telephone/terminal equipment, such as the American Bell Merlin system, PCs, and mid-sized computers running on the company's proprietary Unix operating system.

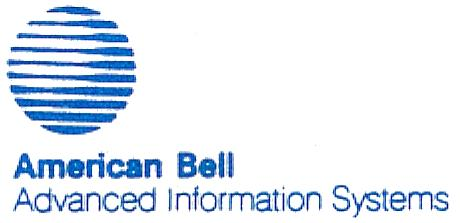
American Bell Advanced Information Systems logo

On January 1, 1983, a year prior to the final breakup of the Bell System in 1984, American Bell Advanced Information Systems (AIS) was launched as an unregulated AT&T subsidiary with a mission to directly challenge IBM in the communications/computer space. Led by Mr. Archie J. McGill, who joined AT&T in 1973 after a rapid rise at the International Business Machines Corporation. McGill was charged with transitioning and positioning the telephone company for the era of deregulated head-to-head competition in the high-tech market. The new enterprise was introduced to the world with a splash on New Year's Eve 1983 at New York Times Square when the traditional New Year's Eve crystal countdown ball was replaced with a crystal version of the new American Bell Advanced Information System's "Globe" logo. In 1984, the American Bell Advanced Information Systems name was changed to AT&T Information Systems.

=== Logo ===
The AT&T Globe logo, originally designed by Saul Bass and sometimes informally called the "Death Star" for its visual similarity to the weapon of that name in the Star Wars movie franchise, originated for use with American Bell. When Judge Greene banned AT&T from using any Bell marks whatsoever after the breakup, except for usage of the Bell Labs name, AT&T switched over to the Globe logo.

=== Post-breakup ===
Since AT&T was required to divest the Bell logo and trademark to the Baby Bells, American Bell was renamed AT&T Information Systems on January 1, 1984. The business unit, American Bell Advanced Information Systems, was absorbed into AT&T Network Systems, while American Bell Consumer Products, renamed AT&T Consumer Products, became a unit of AT&T Technologies.

AT&T Information Systems held its status as separate from any other AT&T company until 1986, following several FCC decisions which loosened restrictions set before the breakup. It was completely absorbed into American Telephone and Telegraph Company in 1989. In 1991, portions, of the former AT&T Information Systems would be later spun out as Unix System Laboratories; AT&T Information Systems had held the Unix copyrights from 1985 until 1989.

== Products ==
=== AT&T PC 6300 ===
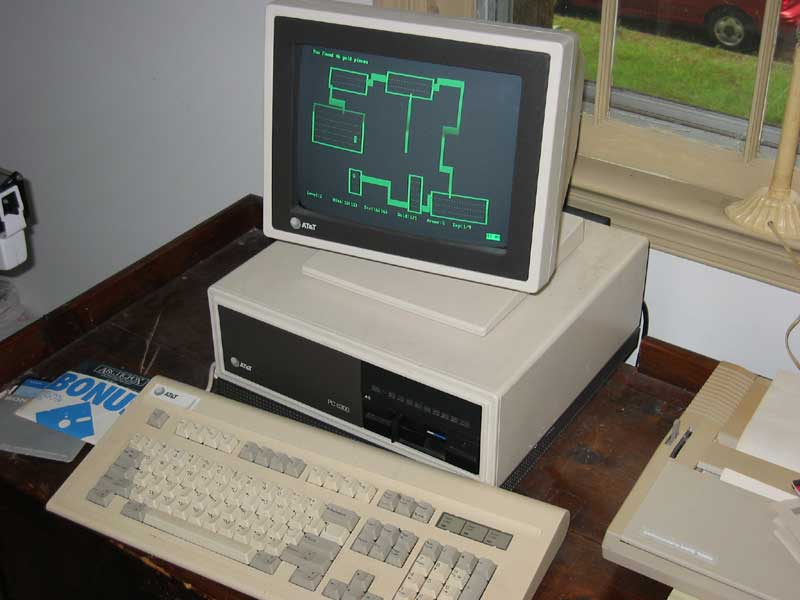
The AT&T PC 6300

On December 22, 1983, AT&T announced an agreement to acquire a twenty-five percent interest in Italian computer manufacturer, Olivetti. As part of the agreement, the two companies agreed to share manufacturing resources. This allowed AT&T to utilize Olivetti to manufacture its AT&T PC 6300 line of desktop PCs as a re-badged M24 beginning in June 1984.

Although considered AT&T's entry-level product, the PC 6300 featured a 16-bit Intel 8086 processor at nearly twice the clock speed of the IBM Personal Computer, the PC 6300 was intended to compete directly with the IBM Personal Computer AT, and was sold with MS-DOS. It was later marketed for use with Microsoft's Xenix operating system.
