= Western Electric =

American electrical engineering and manufacturing company

Western Electric Co., Inc.
- Type: Subsidiary
- Industry: Telecommunications
- Founded: 1869; 157 years ago
- Defunct: February 7, 1996; 30 years ago
- Fate: Absorption, remnants operating as Nokia
- Successor: AT&T Technologies; Lucent Technologies; Alcatel-Lucent; Nokia
- Headquarters: Manhattan, New York City, U.S.
- Products: Telephones, Central office switches, computers, electrical and electronics parts, and all other telecommunications related products supplied to Bell System companies
- Parent: AT&T Corporation (1881–1996)

Western Electric Co., Inc. was an American electrical engineering and manufacturing company that operated from 1869 to 1996. A subsidiary of AT&T Corporation for most of its lifespan, Western Electric was the primary manufacturer, supplier, and purchasing agent for all telephone equipment for the Bell System from 1881 until 1984, when the Bell System was dismantled.

For much of the 20th century, Western Electric's equipment, especially their telephones, was ubiquitous throughout most of the United States and Canada. This was a result of the Bell System's near-total monopoly on phone service, combined with the legal ban on connecting third-party premises equipment to the telephone network.

The company was responsible for many technological innovations, as well as developments in industrial management.

== History ==
=== 19th century ===
In 1856, George Shawk, a craftsman and telegraph maker, purchased an electrical engineering business in Cleveland, Ohio.

In January 1869, Shawk had partnered with Enos M. Barton in the former Western Union repair shop of Cleveland, to manufacture burglar alarms, fire alarms, and other electrical items. Both men were former Western Union employees. Shawk was the Cleveland shop foreman and Barton, was a telegrapher from Rochester, New York. During their partnership, one customer was an inventor sourcing parts and models for experiments. That inventor was Elisha Gray, a former physics professor at Oberlin College. Barton thought of future growth in electrical apparatus potential for the company and shared a common enthusiasm with the inventor, who was interested in leading a manufacturing plant capable of long-term developments.

Shawk found those plans were beyond his business goals and offered to sell his half-interest partnership to Gray. Anson Stager, a former Chief of the U.S. Military Telegraphs during the American Civil War, advanced money for Gray to buy the half-interest and become a partner when Gray and Barton moved operations to Chicago. Gray and Barton previously knew Stager and an agreement was signed on November 18, 1869, to launch the company as Gray & Barton. The firm was open for business by the end of the year in Chicago. In December 1869, the location was at 162 South Water Street in Chicago.

On December 31, 1869, Stager entered a partnership with Barton, and later sold his share to inventor Gray. In 1872, Barton and Gray moved the business to Clinton Street, and incorporated it as the Western Electric Manufacturing Company on the Near West Side of Chicago. They manufactured a variety of electrical products including typewriters, alarms, and lighting and had a close relationship with telegraph company Western Union, to whom they supplied relays and other equipment.

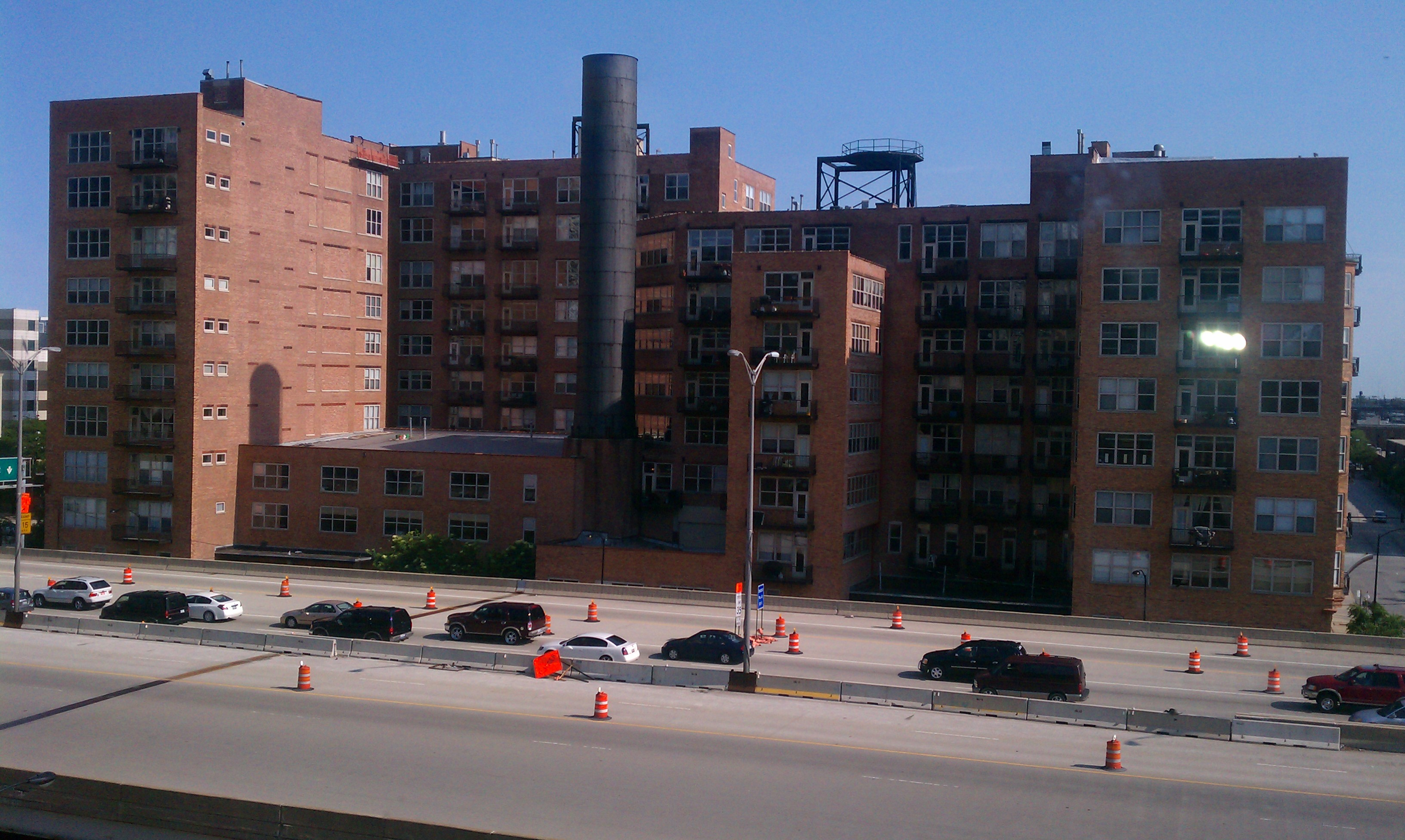
Former Western Electric factory on Clinton Street, converted into loft apartments

In 1875, Gray sold his interests to Western Union, including the caveat that he had filed against Alexander Graham Bell's patent application for the telephone. The ensuing legal battle between Western Union and the Bell Telephone Company over patent rights ended in 1879 with Western Union withdrawing from the telephone market and Bell acquiring Western Electric in 1881. This purchase was a crucial step in standardizing telephone instruments and concentrating manufacturing in a single entity.

In the company's first few years as Western Electric, there were five manufacturing locations located at Chicago (220-232 Kinzie St.) New York, Boston, Indianapolis and Antwerp, Belgium. The locations were not permanent, as the headquarters in Chicago had moved to a new building on Clinton Street, the New York shop had moved two city blocks to a new building on Greenwich Street, and both Boston and Indianapolis factories closed. The Antwerp location was at the same location under Western Electric operations until sold in 1925 to ITT.

In April 1879, the New York shop was located at 62-68 New Church Street, Lower Manhattan, New York. Western Union had a factory at that location and the Western Electric company known as W.E. Mfg. Co., at the time, had purchased Western Union's New York Factory to continue the increase of phone production. This site would also place the end to Western Union factories.

The Boston shop was located at 109-115 Court Street and it was previously known as the Charles Williams, Jr factory that was purchased by Western Electric in 1882. The consolidation of operations was done in 1884 to Chicago and New York factories by Charles Williams becoming a Western Electric Manager.

In 1888–1889, Western Electric built a 10-story factory building at 125 Greenwich Street in Lower Manhattan, to manufacture some of the first telephones. The New York shop that was renting the Western Union building moved to this building.

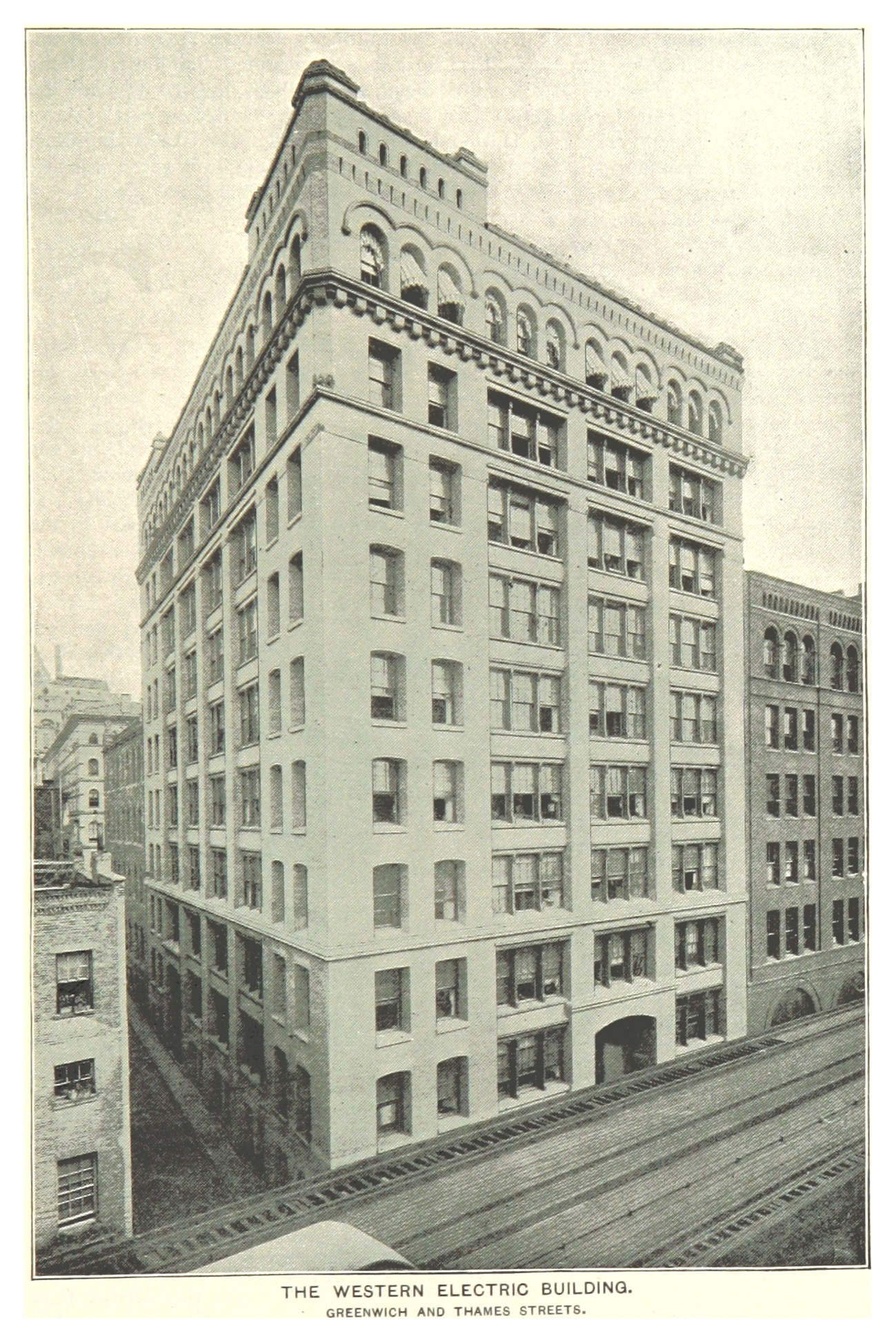
1893 The Western Electric factory. Greenwich and Thames Streets

In preparation for the Chicago Worlds Fair of 1892, Western Electric was responsible for the organized Bell System sales activities and merchandising of apparatus for the 900 long-distance circuit from New York to Chicago. In 1897, the building at 463 West Street, New York was constructed and housed the New York shop as well as the company Eastern headquarters.

A 1969 Western Electric keychain medallion celebrating the 100th anniversary of the company's founding made from the company's recycled bronze metal of scrapped telephone equipment and issued to employees with an inscribed personal registration number

Western Electric was the first company to join in a Japanese joint venture with foreign capital. In 1899, it invested in a 54% share of the Nippon Electric Company, Ltd. Western Electric's representative in Japan was Walter Tenney Carleton. The company, later known as NEC, would eventually become a major international manufacturer of electronics equipment including semiconductors and personal computers.

=== 20th century ===
In 1901, Western Electric secretly purchased a controlling interest in a principal competitor, the Kellogg Switchboard & Supply Company, but in 1909 was forced by a lawsuit to sell back to Milo Kellogg.

The Manufacturers Junction Railway Company was incorporated in January 1903 to provide rail connections to major railroad systems. There were approximately 13 miles (21 km) of track in and out of Hawthorne Works for rail freight of inbound materials and outbound finished products. Western Electric had a tenure of 50 years up to 1952, in the responsibility and operation of its use for Hawthorne and other nearby industrial companies.

Also, in 1903, the construction of Hawthorne Works first buildings were authorized by Barton.

In 1907, the research and development staffs of Western Electric and AT&T were consolidated to 463 West Street, New York. The location served the newly Western Electric Engineering Department for the responsibility of the testing and inspection of its telephones and equipment. AT&T's Engineering Department retained the responsibility for the growth of the Bell System with compatible equipment and service. Gradually the consolidation improved and advanced the telephony response to expanding use.

On July 24, 1915, employees of the Hawthorne Works boarded the SS Eastland in downtown Chicago for a company picnic. The ship rolled over at the dock and 844 people died.

In 1920, Alice Heacock Seidel was the first female Western Electric employee given permission to stay on after she had married. This set a precedent in the company, which previously had not allowed married women in their employ. Heacock had worked for Western Electric for sixteen years before her marriage, and was at the time the highest-paid secretary in the company. In her memoirs, she wrote that the decision to allow her to stay on "required a meeting of the top executives to decide whether I might remain with the Company, for it established a precedent and a new policy for the Company – that of married women in their employ. If the women at the top were permitted to remain after marriage then all women would expect the same privilege. The policy was expanded quickly, so that a few years later women were given maternity leaves with no loss of time on their service records."

Western Electric was expanding beyond making telephone equipment and American Bell noticed its division from a manufacturing business to a supply business. Western Electric in 1921 split the supply department from the manufacturing business, and this led to a separate entity.

In 1925, ITT purchased the Bell Telephone Manufacturing Company of Brussels, Belgium, and other worldwide subsidiaries from AT&T, to avoid an antitrust action. The company manufactured rotary system switching equipment under the Western Electric brand.

Western Electric also managed an electrical equipment distribution business, furnishing its customers with non-telephone products made by other manufacturers. This electrical distribution business was spun off from Western Electric in 1925 and organized into a separate company, Graybar Electric Company, in honor of the company's founders, Elisha Gray and Enos Barton.

Bell Telephone Laboratories, created from the engineering department of Western Electric in 1925, was half-owned by Western Electric, the other half belonging to AT&T.

The company began to increase its presence in other sectors of industry for new products. In September 1931, the Teletype Corporation headquartered in Chicago on Wrightwood Ave, became a subsidiary of Western Electric and it was a manufacturer of teletypewriters for TWX services. There was the acquisition in 1931 of the Nassau Smelting and Refining plant located in Totenville, Staten Island, New York to recycle Bell System scrap wire, metal, and becoming a subsidiary of Western Electric. The acquisition of the Queensboro factory in Middle Village, New York became a Western Electric Shop in the 1930s to produce wooden telephone booths.

In 1974, the IBEW members at Western Electric's 16 plants went on strike over improved benefits, cost‐of‐living adjustments, and pay increase for up to three years. The ratified contract was agreed on September 3, 1974, with employees at 13 plants returning to work. Only the company's subsidiary Teletype Corporation plant in Little Rock, Arkansas and two plants, the Columbia River Switching Equipment factory in Vancouver, Washington and in San Ramon, California were subject to ratification or in negotiations to settle local agreements.

In 1983, corporate announcements were made at the three oldest manufacturing facilities for product manufacturing transfers and employee expected layoffs. The Kearny Works facility that made systems to convert commercial power to run various telecom equipment, would transfer remaining work to Dallas Works. The shutdown of the plant would eliminate 4,000 jobs. The Baltimore Works facility that made connectors and protectors for wire and cable had work moved to Omaha Works. A total of 2,300 jobs were potentially eliminated after that announcement. The Hawthorne Works facility, had the operations for pulp cable relocated to Phoenix Works. A loss of 400 positions were expected eliminated in the process.

After the Bell System breakup, Western Electric facilities were known as AT&T Technologies facilities in 1984. The three largest and oldest facilities, Hawthorne Works, Kearny Works, and Baltimore Works, were closed shortly thereafter due to "excess space".

=== Company logos ===
Western Electric used various logos during its existence. Starting in 1914 it used an image of a statue originally named Electricity, but later renamed Spirit of Communication, which was raised to the roof of 195 Broadway on October 24, 1916.

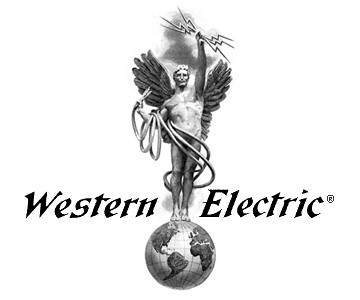
1914 company masthead logo (Spirit of Communication)

Logo until c. 1969

Logo 1969–1984

== Presidents ==
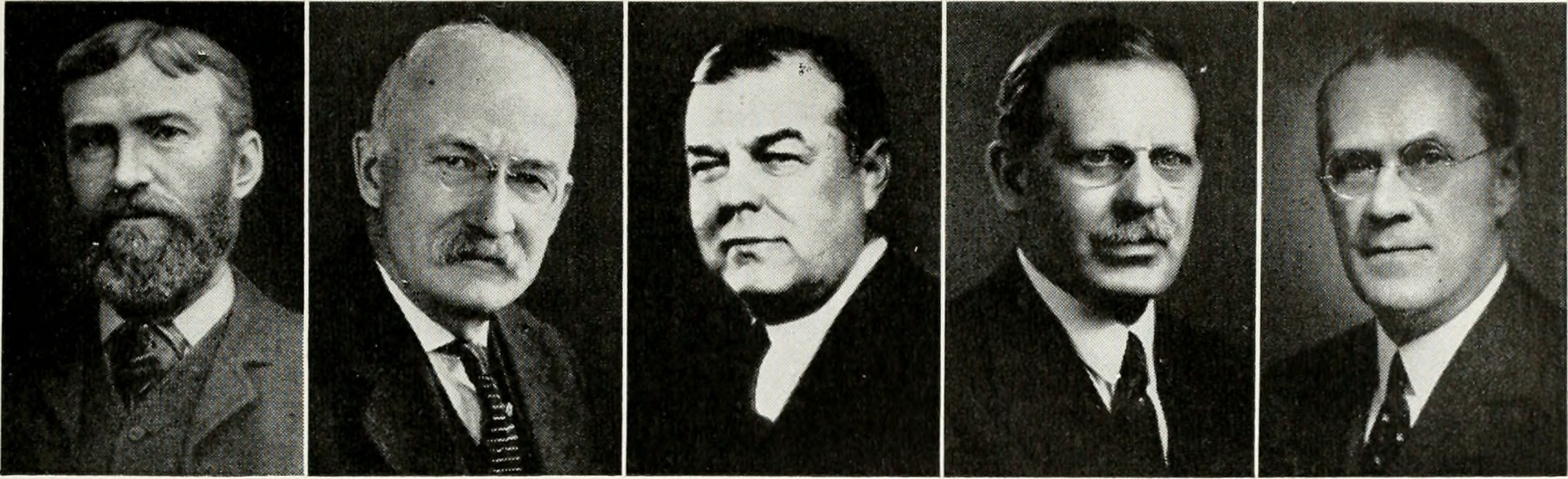
Western Electric Presidents #2 Smoot, #4 Thayer, #5 Du Bois, #6 Bloom, and #7 Stoll

Presidents
	Period	Name of President	Lifetime
1	December 1881 – January 1885	Anson Stager	1825–1885
2	January 1885 – February 1886	William Algernon Sydney Smoot	1845–1886
3	October 1886 – October 1908	Enos Melancthon Barton	1842–1916
4	October 1908 – July 1919	Harry Bates Thayer	1858–1936
5	July 1919 – August 1926	Charles Gilbert Du Bois	1870–1940
6	August 1926 – December 1939	Edgar Selden Bloom	dates unknown
7	January 1940 – September 1947	Clarence Griffith Stoll	dates unknown
8	October 1947 – December 1953	Stanley Bracken	1890–1966
9	January 1954 – September 1956	Frederick Kappel	1902–1994
10	September 1956 – March 1959	Arthur Burton Goetze	dates unknown
11	March 1959 – December 1963	Haakon Ingolf Romnes	1907–1973
12	January 1964 – November 1969	Paul Albert Gorman	1908–1996
13	December 1969 – October 1971	Harvey George Mehlhouse	unknown–1998
14	November 1971 — December 1983	Donald Eugene Procknow	1923–2016

== Development of a monopoly ==
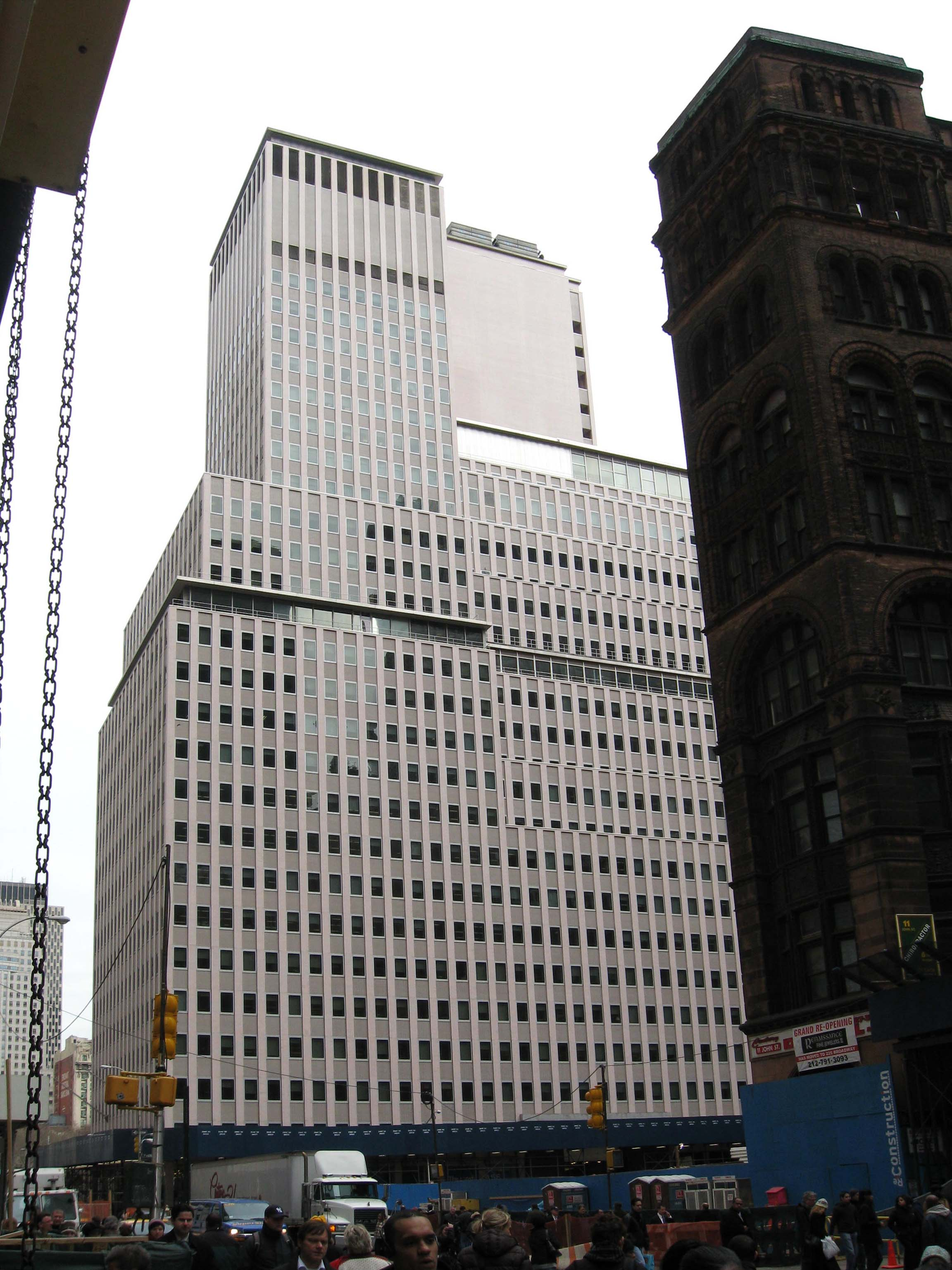
222 Broadway, where the company's headquarters were once located

In 1915, the assets of Western Electric Manufacturing were transferred to a newly incorporated company in the New York City, named Western Electric Company, Inc., a wholly owned subsidiary of AT&T. The sole reason for the transfer was to provide for the issuance of a non-voting preferred class of capital stock, disallowed under the statutes of the state of Illinois.

In the Bell System, telephones were leased by the operating companies to subscribers, and remained the property of the Bell System. Service subscribers paid a monthly fee included in the service charge, while paying additionally for special types or features of telephones, such as colored telephone sets. Equipment repair was included in the fees. This system had the effect of subsidizing basic telephone service, keeping local telephone service inexpensive, under $10 per month. After divestiture, basic service prices increased, and customers became responsible for inside building wiring and telephone equipment. The Bell System had an extensive policy and infrastructure to recycle or refurbish equipment taken out of service, replacing all defective, weak, or otherwise unusable parts for new installations. This resulted in extraordinary longevity of Western Electric telephones, and limited the variety of new designs introduced into the market place. This led Western Electric to pursue extreme reliability and durability in design to minimize service calls. In particular, the work of Walter A. Shewhart, who developed new techniques for statistical quality control in the 1920s, helped lead to the quality of manufacture of Western Electric telephones.

AT&T also strictly enforced policies against using telephone equipment by other manufacturers on their network. A customer who insisted on using a telephone not supplied by the Bell System had to first transfer the phone to the local Bell operating company, who leased the phone back to the customer for a monthly charge in addition to a re-wiring fee. In the 1970s, when consumers increasingly bought telephone sets from other manufacturers, AT&T changed the policy for its Design Line telephone series by selling customers the phone housing, retaining ownership of the internal mechanical and electrical components, which still required paying AT&T a monthly leasing fee.

Starting in 1983, with the breakup of the Bell System, Western Electric telephones could be sold to the public under the brand name American Bell, a newly created subsidiary of AT&T. One of the terms of the Modification of Final Judgment in the Bell System divestiture procedures prohibited AT&T from using the name Bell after January 1, 1984; prior to this, AT&T's plan was to market products and services under the American Bell name, accompanied by the now familiar AT&T globe logo.

== Manufacturing plants ==
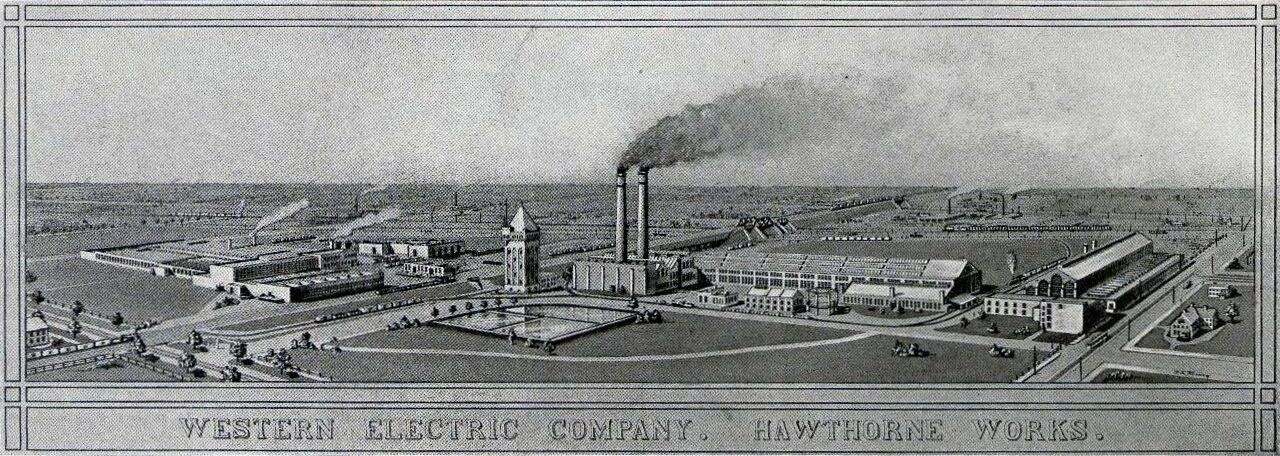
Hawthorne Works in a 1907 aerial view shown in a company brochure

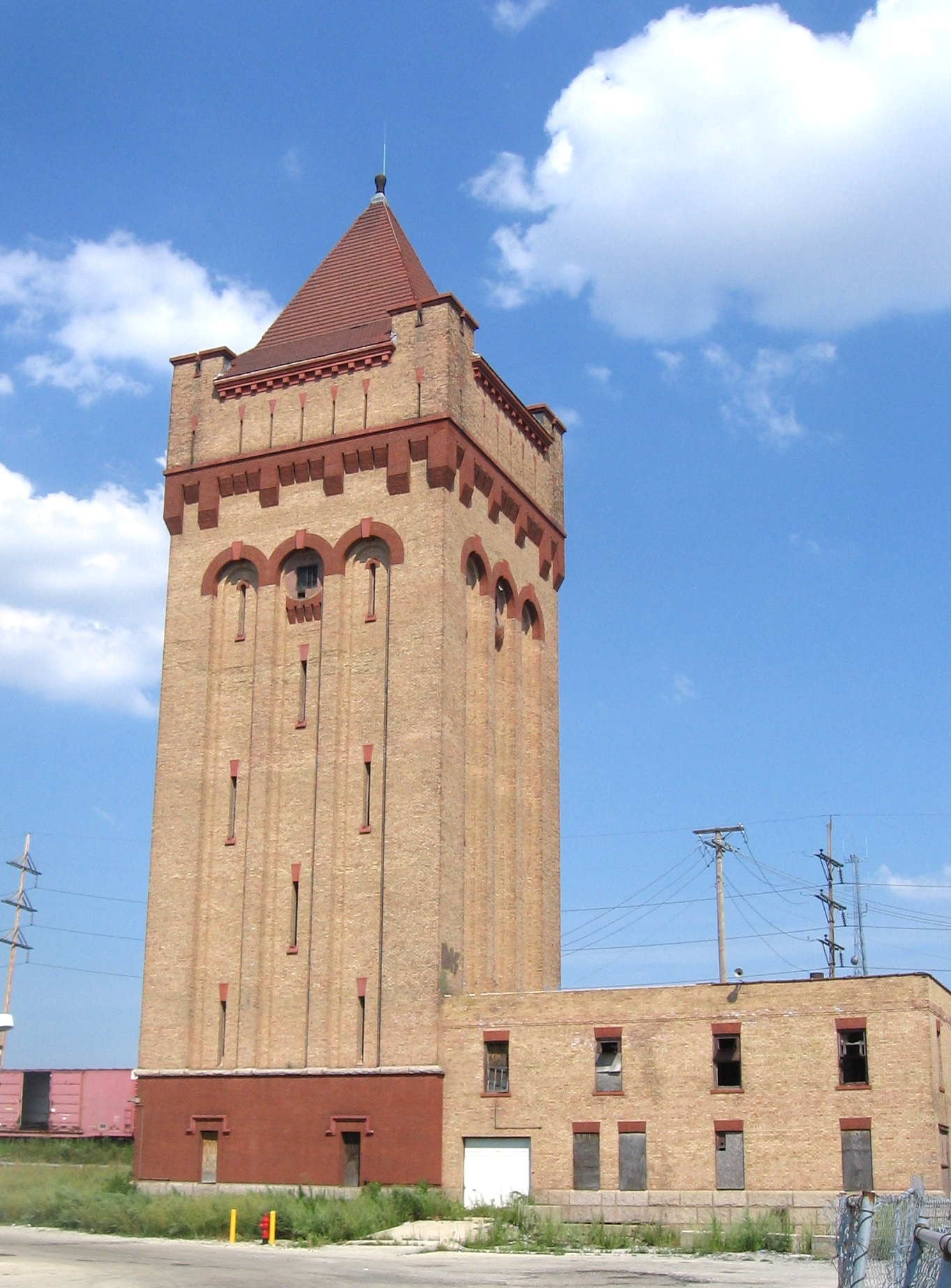
Tower of former Hawthorne Works (as of 2012)

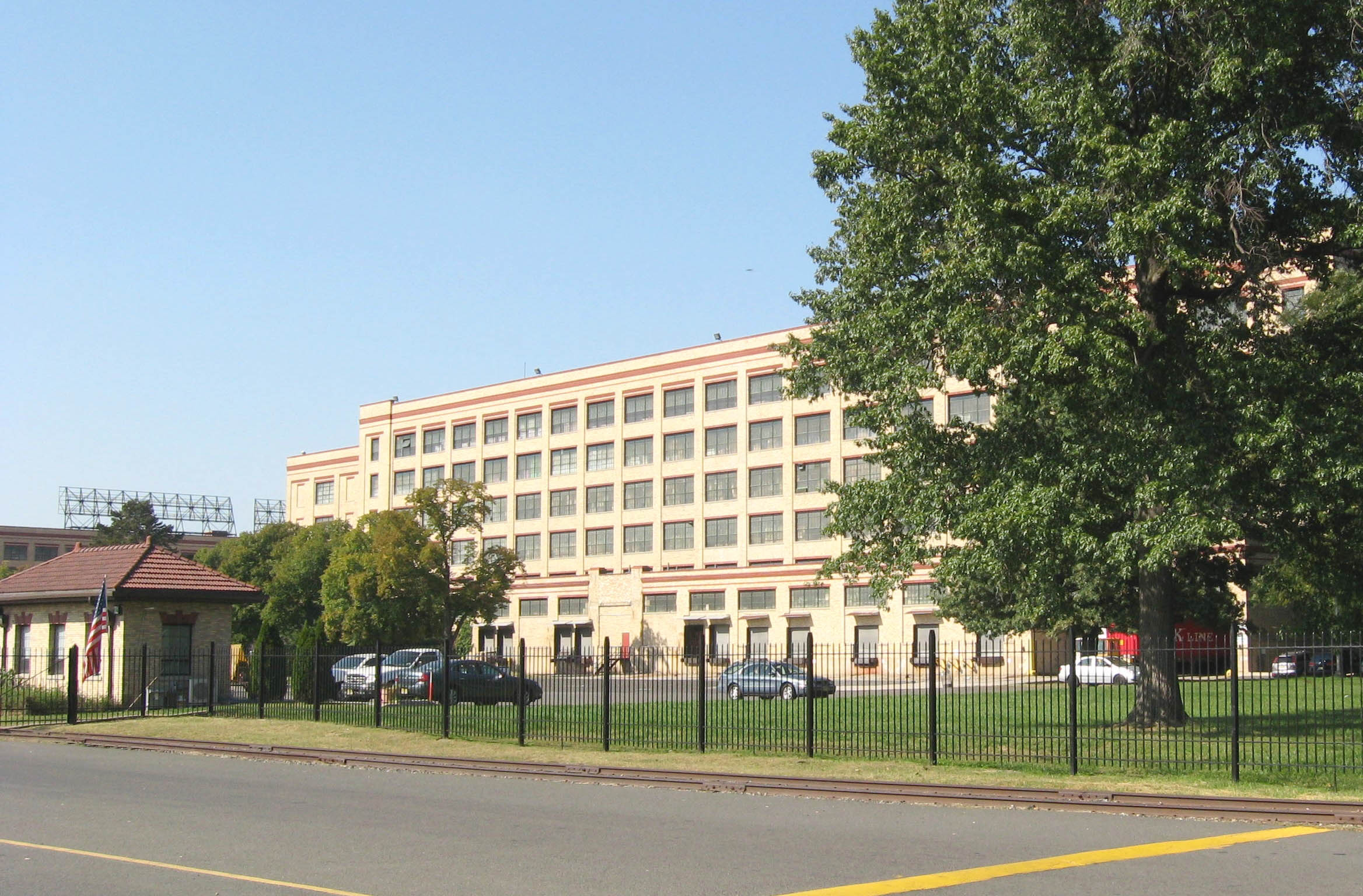
Former Kearny Works

In 1903, Western Electric began construction of the first buildings for Hawthorne Works on the outskirts of Chicago. In 1905, the Clinton Street power apparatus shops moved to Hawthorne.

Further expansion of large factories began in the 1920s. In 1923, construction began on the second factory located in Kearny, New Jersey. The location was known as Kearny Works and in 1925 began telephone cable production. On June 15, 1928, Western Electric employees, photographed by Rosenfeld and Sons, were pictured, in a groundbreaking ceremony, for their expansion of the Kearny Works manufacturing facility at 110 Central Ave, Kearny, New Jersey. Kearny Works would achieve the largest square foot size of 3,579,000 throughout the years and be the second largest plant for Western Electric manufacturing plants built before the 1930s, only second in size to the Hawthorne Works at Cicero, Illinois. Here is an aerial image of Kearny Works, between 1925 and 1930, held in the Library Company of Philadelphia. with the picture of the entire plant and railways. In 1929, work began at Point Breeze, Baltimore, Maryland as the third manufacturing location, Baltimore Works, began its occupancy by 1930 for various cable and wire production.

Two manufacturing plants in Lincoln, Nebraska were leased in 1943 to Western Electric to manufacture signal corps equipment and later production demands from Hawthorne Works. The Eighth Street building, known as "Lincoln Shops," and the 13th Street building were the locations, the latter was sold in 1950 for $500,000 to Western Electric. The plants were closed after the Omaha Works opened in 1958.

Western Electric acquired, in 1943, the old Grad and Winchell buildings located at Haverhill, Massachusetts. New Jersey supervisors taught former textile and shoe workers the manufacturing process of coil winding. The employees' acquired skills demonstrated their versatility in this new manufacturing process for a Western Electric decision to join Haverhill and Lawrence locations in 1956 as the Merrimack Valley Works.

In 1944, Western Electric purchased a factory in St. Paul, Minnesota to restart manufacture of telephone sets for civilian installation as authorized by War Production Board. By 1946, some of these facilities were relocated to the Hawthorne plant as space became available from war-production scale down.

Also, the reduced production of home telephones because of the war, began to have a backlog of two million orders in late 1945 for the Hawthorne plant. Western Electric had acquired a former Studebaker plant on Archer Avenue (Chicago, Illinois) for assemblers that produced out one hundred thousand Model 302s telephones by March 1946.

After World War II, the National Carbon Company left a facility that had manufactured United States Navy submarine batteries and underwater detonators in Winston-Salem. This facility at 800 Chatham Road, was passed to Western Electric Company and operated until 1966 for production of national telephone companies' switches and circuits. Additionally, the location complex was one of three nationwide Western Electric field engineering sites.

The mid-1940s brought occupancy to locations. A plant was established in 1946 at Tonawanda, New York to produce equipment wiring cable, telephone cords, enamelled wire, and insulated wire. This plant was called "Buffalo Plant." A satellite shop was established in Jersey City, New Jersey called "Marion Shops" and occupied in 1947. This location produced portable test sets, rectifiers, and power equipment for the main plant known as the Kearny Works. In July 1948, the equipment plant at Duluth, Minnesota was involved in the National Labors Act with bargaining units of IAM and IBEW.

Between 1947 and 1961, eight Works locations were built and occupied, located in Allentown, Pennsylvania, Indianapolis, Indiana, Winston-Salem, North Carolina, Merrimack Valley, Omaha, Nebraska, Columbus, Ohio, Oklahoma City, Oklahoma, and Kansas City, Missouri for the high volume of manufacturing products. The North Carolina Works was located in Winston-Salem, North Carolina. The Merrimack Valley Works location was in North Andover, Massachusetts. The Kansas City Works location was in Lee's Summit, Missouri.

A Lawrence, Massachusetts factory opened on November 13, 1951, and was called the "Garfield Shops." The location started with as a wired units job and there were thirteen workers with a section chief and one maintenance man. In 1955, the Lawrence plant reached its peak employment at more than 2,000 employees. This Bell Labs research and development satellite had 40 Bell Telephone Laboratories engineers and 25 Western Electric employees. Carrier equipment used filters made with Polystyrene condensers at this Garfield Shops or later referred as Lawrence Shops.

In 1952, the Reading, Pennsylvania plant began when Western Electric converted an old Rosedale knitting mill in Laureldale into a factory. On August 22, 1952, the facility opened to produce new electronic components for the U.S. government for use by the military and the space program.

In the mid-1950s, Western Electric established several more satellite "Shops" that were smaller locations reporting to the larger "Works" locations. The "Montgomery Shops" were occupied in 1955 to produce Data-Phone data sets, wire spring relays, and test sets. Although, it was located in Montgomery, Illinois, it reported and supported production of the main plant, Hawthorne Works in Cicero, Illinois. The Kearny Works facility had satellite shops that were apart from its location but were part of the manufacturing process. Located in Fair Lawn, New Jersey and occupied since 1956, the "Fair Lawn Shops" produced coils, resistors, transformers, and keys under Kearny manufacturing. The Indianapolis Works facility was producing telephone sets and components with a satellite shop. The Indianapolis shop known as "Washington Street Shop" produced miscellaneous subscriber apparatus since its occupancy in 1957. The "Lawrence Shop" that was occupied in 1957 produced BELLBoy receivers, telephone repeaters and carrier products under Merrimack Valley Works. The "Clark Shop" was occupied in 1959 at Clark, New Jersey and manufactured submarine cable repeaters and components. The satellite shop was under Kearny Works.

The 1960s and 1970s had various new facilities built and occupied by Western Electric to produce new technologies such as electronic switching equipment (Dallas and North Illinois), fiber optic cable networks (Atlanta), power systems (Phoenix), business equipment (Denver), and telephone equipment (Shreveport).

In 1970, Western Electric purchased land in Bishop Ranch, San Ramon, California for a permanent plant. The 200,000 square-foot leased plant began in June 1971. In 1974, there were 490 IBEW employee members on strike over local agreement issues. In 1975, this San Ramon Valley Plant announced a September 30 closure of its telephone transmission equipment manufacturing operations.

On January 27, 1983, the Kearny facility was announced for closure due to technology changes, underutilized, and too costly to maintain. The phase out of the facility jobs started in fall of 1983 and the 59 year old, 3 million-square-foot, 144-acre facility was sold officially on May 21, 1984, with nearly 1000 last employees left at the plant. The former facility was purchased and later existed as warehouses, distribution, research and light manufacturing facilities.

As modern facilities around the country were used for the operations of Hawthorne and its productions distributed, announcement was made on June 24, 1983, for closure. Between 1975 and 1983, the Foundry and most of the Telephone Apparatus buildings were demolished and in 1986–1987, the remaining Telephone Apparatus buildings and the Executive Tower were demolished. The Hawthorne facility was in operations for 83 years when it closed its doors in 1986 and torn down for a shopping center. Another building was demolished on April 10, 1994, for a shopping center parking lot, with a remaining two buildings converted. A water tower is the remaining physical association of the industrial research complex where telephones, electronics, military equipment and business management innovations were produced by a facility that once existed.

The Baltimore facility closed on February 28, 1986. The facility, which had once employed 6,200, was staffed by 65 employees on the closure date.

By the time AT&T was dissolved in the early 1980s, more than twenty production plants around the country ("Works" locations) had been established.

In 1967, a telephone directory provides the following snapshot of manufacturing facilities:

Facility	Address / Location	Date of occupancy	Gross floor space	Principal products / Notes
Allentown Works	555 Union Boulevard / Allentown, Pennsylvania	1948	1,036,000 sq ft (96,200 m^{2})	microelectronics / later Agere Systems
Atlanta Works	2000 Northeast Expressway / Norcross, Georgia	1969		undersea cables, later fiber-optic cables /
Baltimore Works	2500 Broening Highway / Baltimore, Maryland	1930	2,491,000 sq ft (231,400 m^{2})	coaxial and marine cables, wire, cords / plant operated from 1930 to 1984
Buffalo Plant	Kenmore Ave and Vulcan St. / Tonawanda, New York	1946	968,000 sq ft (89,900 m^{2})	telephone cords and switches / ceased operation November 4, 1977
Burlington Shops	204 Graham-Hopedale Rd. / Burlington, North Carolina	1946	698,000 sq ft (64,800 m^{2})	military equipment—Nike Missile System, underwater sound systems, waveguide, Bell System speakerphone / Known as Tarheel Army Missile Plant, Operations 1946-1954
Columbia River Switching Equipment Works	Vancouver, Washington			crossbar switching equipment / 590 IBEW employees in 1974
Columbus Works	6200 E. Broad Street / Columbus, Ohio	1959	1,661,000 sq ft (154,300 m^{2})	switching equipment /
Dallas Works	3000 Skyline Drive / Mesquite, Texas	1970		electronic switches and power equipment/supplies /
Denver Works	1100 W. 120th Avenue / Westminster, Colorado	1972		Dimension and Horizon business PBX systems /
Engineering Research Center (ERC)	330 Carter Road / Princeton, New Jersey	1961		research & development on manufacturing technologies /
Greensboro Shops	801 Merritt Drive / Greensboro, North Carolina	1950	336,000 sq ft (31,200 m^{2})	printed wiring boards, machined parts, crystal filters, ESS card writers, military magnetic apparatus and printed waveguide devices / ceased operation in 1976
Hawthorne Works	Cicero Avenue and Cermak Road / Cicero, Illinois	1904	4,908,000 sq ft (456,000 m^{2})	cable, rod, wire, step by step, panel dia panel, 1ESS, 2ESS, 101 switching, metal parts/tools, capacitors, thin-film circuits, switchboards / During World War II, 48,000 employees peaked; in 1970, 23,364 employees; in 1983, 4,200 workers. Closed in 1983 and subsequently demolished, one of the towers remains.
Indianapolis Works	2525 Shadeland Avenue / Indianapolis, Indiana	1950	1,824,000 sq ft (169,500 m^{2})	consumer telephone sets /
Kansas City Works	777 N. Blue Parkway / Lee's Summit, Missouri	1961	1,517,000 sq ft (140,900 m^{2})	electronics, switching equipment /
Kearny Works	100 Central Ave / 3 Distribution Avenue / Kearny, New Jersey	1925	3,579,000 sq ft (332,500 m^{2})	cable, wire, switchboards and consoles, relays, jacks, power supplies and other equipment /
Merrimack Valley Works	1600 Osgood Street / North Andover, Massachusetts	1956	1,565,000 sq ft (145,400 m^{2})	transmission equipment /
Montgomery Shops	River Street / Aurora, Illinois	1955		Data-phone transmission sets, traffic service position sets, telephone parts / closed and demolished 1987
New River Valley Plant	Caller 21 / Radford, Virginia	1980	500,000 sq ft (46,000 m^{2})	light electronic assembly operations, microelectronics / Purchase price of land and building were over $7 million. The 563,000-square foot facility was located on a 743-acre peninsula overlooking the New River. AT&T Microelectronics phased out in a closure 1990/1991.
North Carolina Works	3300 Old Lexington Road S.E. / Winston-Salem, North Carolina	1954	1,084,000 sq ft (100,700 m^{2})	broadband carrier equipment, inbound signaling, telephone and telegraph repeaters, capacitors, thin film resistors, sealed contacts, magnetic apparatus /
North Illinois Works	4513 Western Avenue / Lisle, Illinois	1970s		3ESS, 4ESS switches, 3B5/15/4000 computer systems
Oklahoma City Works	7725 W. Reno Avenue / Oklahoma City, Oklahoma	1960	1,307,000 sq ft (121,400 m^{2})	payphones, switching equipment /
Omaha Works	132nd and L Streets / Omaha, Nebraska	1958	1,849,000 sq ft (171,800 m^{2})	crossbar, dial, and PBX equipment, cable, relays / "Two key buildings that were part of the original complex: Building 20 (the property's iconic office building) and Building 30 (a former manufacturing/warehouse facility)." were purchased upon the closure in November 2011.
Orlando Works	9701 and 9333 John Young Parkway / Orlando, Florida	early 1980s		microelectronics / later Agere Systems
Phoenix Works	505 N. 51st Avenue / Phoenix, Arizona	1968	850,000 sq ft (79,000 m^{2})	cable and wire /
Reading Works	2525 North 12th Street / Reading, Pennsylvania	1952	1,214,000 sq ft (112,800 m^{2})	microelectronics / later Agere Systems
Richmond Works	4500 Laburnum Avenue / Richmond, Virginia	1973	400,000 sq ft (37,000 m^{2})	printed circuit technology / In 1979, Fortune Magazine designated as one of the 10 best-managed American factories. The 120 acre property was sold by Lucent to Viasystems in 1996. Although, the site was sold by Lucent in 1996, the Environmental Protection Agency (EPA) required remediation of chemicals underground from the operations of Western Electric/AT&T era.
Shreveport Works	9595 Mansfield Road / Shreveport, Louisiana	1967	1,206,000 sq ft (112,000 m^{2})	business and consumer telephone sets, payphones /

== Distribution houses ==
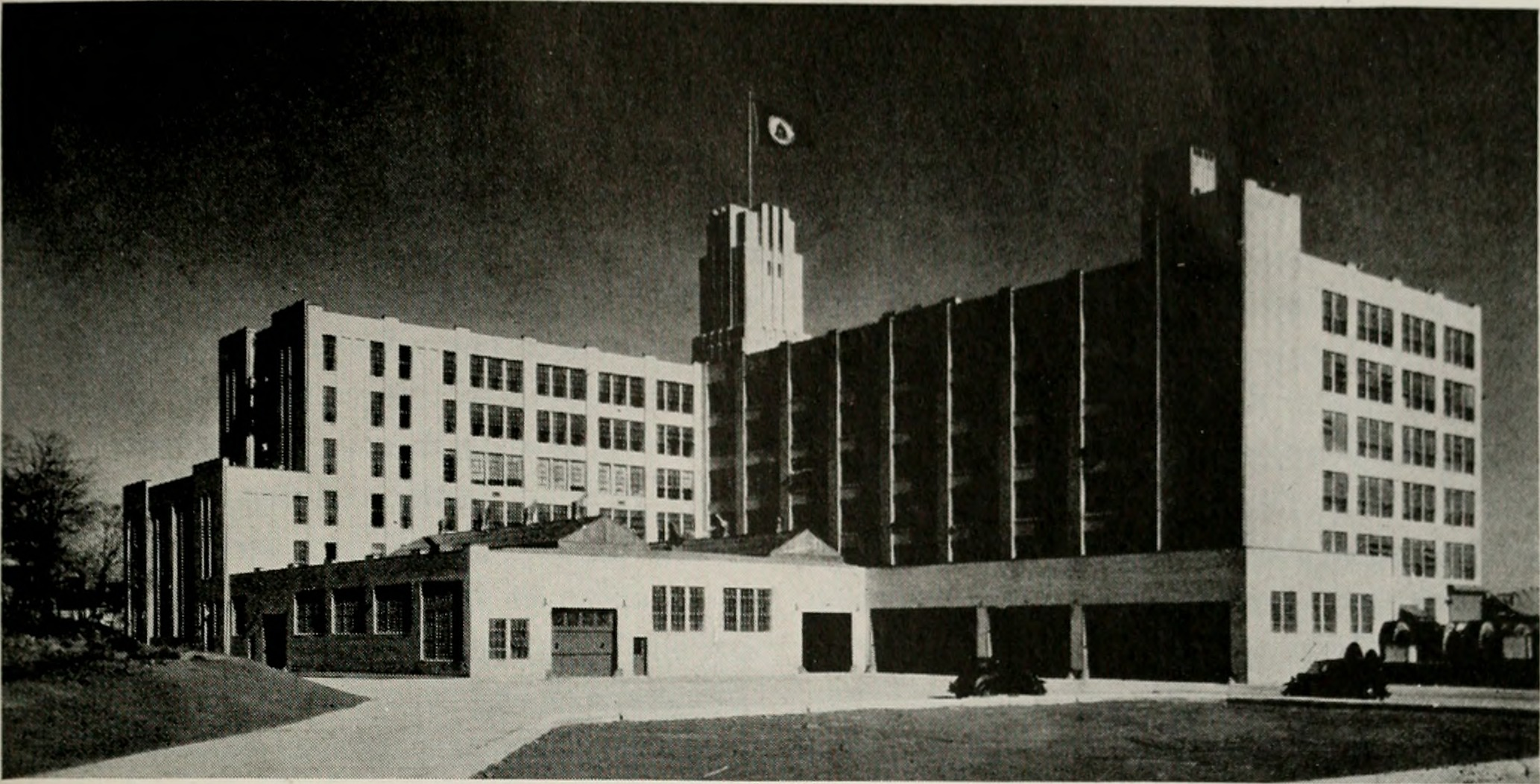
Boston Distribution House located at 705 Mount Auburn Street, Watertown, Massachusetts (1930s-1980s). Leased to Tufts Health Plan (1998) by real estate company and later sold in 2007 for their headquarters. Sold by Tufts, to Spear Street Capital (2021) for life science buildings (pictured 1945).

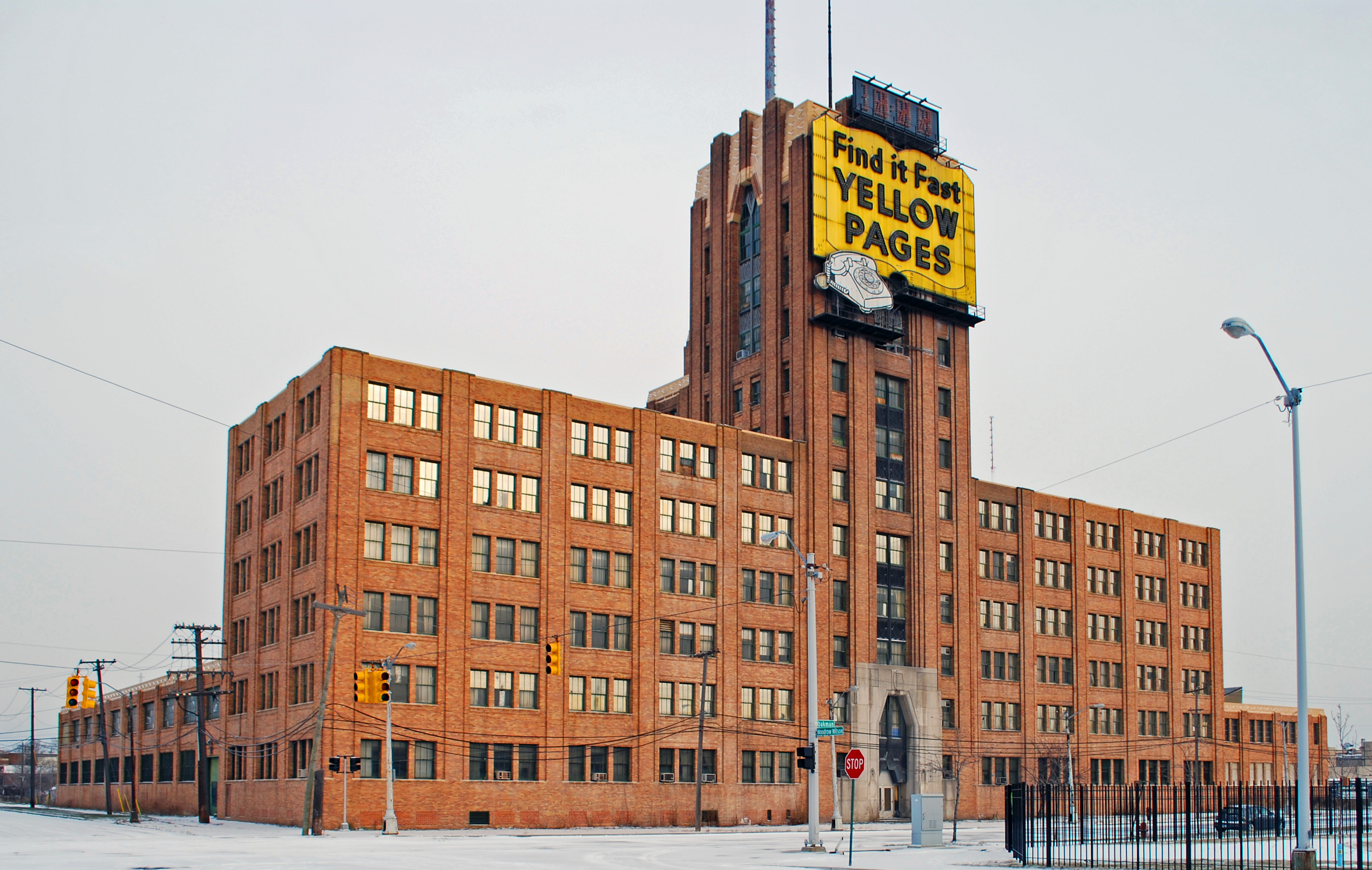
The Western Electric Detroit Distribution House 882 Oakman Boulevard, Detroit, Michigan (1930–1958). Michigan Bell sold the building and later was used as housing by Neighborhood Service Organization.

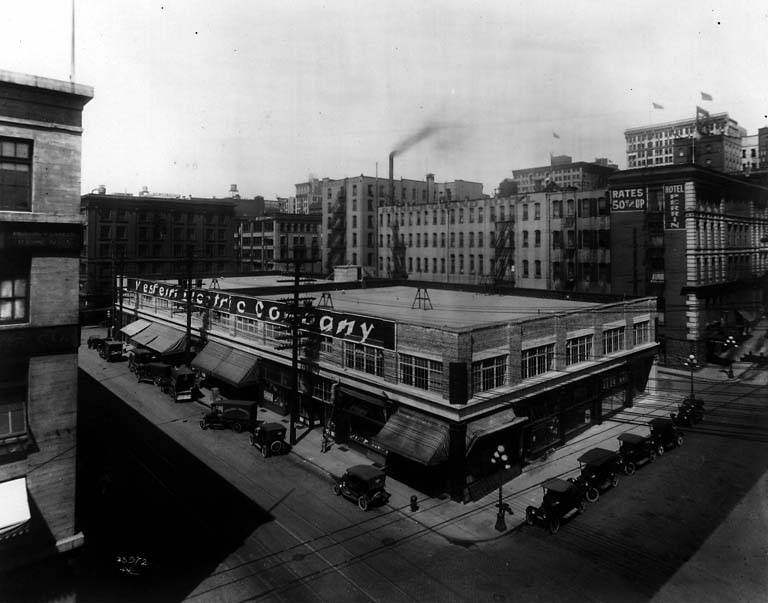
Western Electric Distribution House 84 Marion Street and Western Avenue, Seattle, Washington (pictured 1917). Demolished with other nearby buildings close to 1930s for the construction of the historic Seattle Federal Office Building at Western Ave and First Street.

Western Electric had nine divisions in the mid-1960s. Manufacturing was one division, service was another, and there was also the distribution division. The distribution division was important for supplying the Bell System with day-to-day supply or emergency needs of the telecommunications supply chain. In 1964, there were 35 Distribution Houses that stocked equipment and supplies. They were the supply centers and repair shops for the Bell System. The distribution houses were established as east and west geographical zones in similarity to the service division. The following table showed the distribution houses at that time.

Name	Location	Address	Established	Notes
Atlanta	Service East		1905	
Boston	Service East	705 Mount Auburn Street, Watertown, MA	1908	
Carolinas	Service East Charlotte, North Carolina		1958	
Cincinnati	Service East		1904	
Cleveland	Service East	724 Prospect Ave (1912) E. 65th and Carnegie (1920s) 10101 Woodland Ave (1930s) 32000 Aurora Rd. in Solon, OH (1957)	1912	
Connecticut	Service East Orange, Connecticut		1913	Formerly New Haven.
Dallas	Service West		1908	
Denver	Service East		1903	
Houston	Service West		1912	
Illinois	Service West		1904	Moved from Chicago to West Chicago. Formerly known as Chicago.
Indiana	Service West Indianapolis, Indiana		1906	
Jacksonville	Service East		1927	
Kansas City	Service West		1903	
Long Island	Service East		1926	Formerly Brooklyn.
Los Angeles	Service West		1906	
Miami	Service East		1960	
Michigan	Service West Plymouth, Michigan	909 North Sheldon Road	1908	Formerly located in Detroit since 1930 at 882 Oakman Boulevard. A $5 million building construction began May 1957 on that 420,000 square feet Plymouth building, after 66 other sites were reviewed for this selected 36 acre property. Initially move in December 1958, expected 600 distribution and 50 installation employees. Michigan Bell would have 90 workers for their supply related needs in this facility.
Milwaukee	Service West		1924	
Minneapolis	Service West		1907	
Nashville	Service East		1955	
New Jersey	Service East Union, New Jersey	650 Liberty Avenue	1926	Formerly Newark. Located in the town of Union.
New Orleans	Service East		1912	
New York	Service East		1904	
Omaha	Service West		1963	
Pennsylvania	Service East King of Prussia, Pennsylvania		1901	Formerly Philadelphia. Located in King of Prussia.
Pittsburgh	Service East Pittsburgh, Pennsylvania	6585 Penn Avenue	1904	260 employees in 1966 Original 1904 building was rented near Shadyside Station until this building was complete in 1955. Bell of Pennsylvania was the servicing area for supplies. Refurbishment of wood related items on- switchboards, phonebooths. Repairs of switchboards, teletypewriters, telephone booths, and Bell telephones.
Phoenix	Service West		1958	
Portland	Service West		1910	
St. Louis	Service West St. Louis, Missouri	4250 Duncan Street	1902	The 1902 building was located at 814 Spruce Street and no longer standing. A new building was completed in 1948. The three-story building was designed in Art Moderne architectural style. The Southwestern Bell was the customer base for the supplies in Missouri. The single concrete building was noted that there were eastern and western sections for Western Electric and Southwestern Bell, respectively, accessed from the lobby. Historically, the communications industry and the architecture were the criteria for consideration as a historical place for the National Park Service.
Salt Lake City	Service We		1962	
San Francisco	Service West		1903	
Seattle	Service West	84 Marion Street and Western Avenue, Seattle, WA	1907	
Syracuse	Service East	6181 Thompson Road, East Syracuse, NY	1953	
Washington	Service East		1923	
Westchester	Service East Yonkers, New York	555 Tuckahoe Road	1961	Provided supply for New York Telephone.

== Technological innovations ==
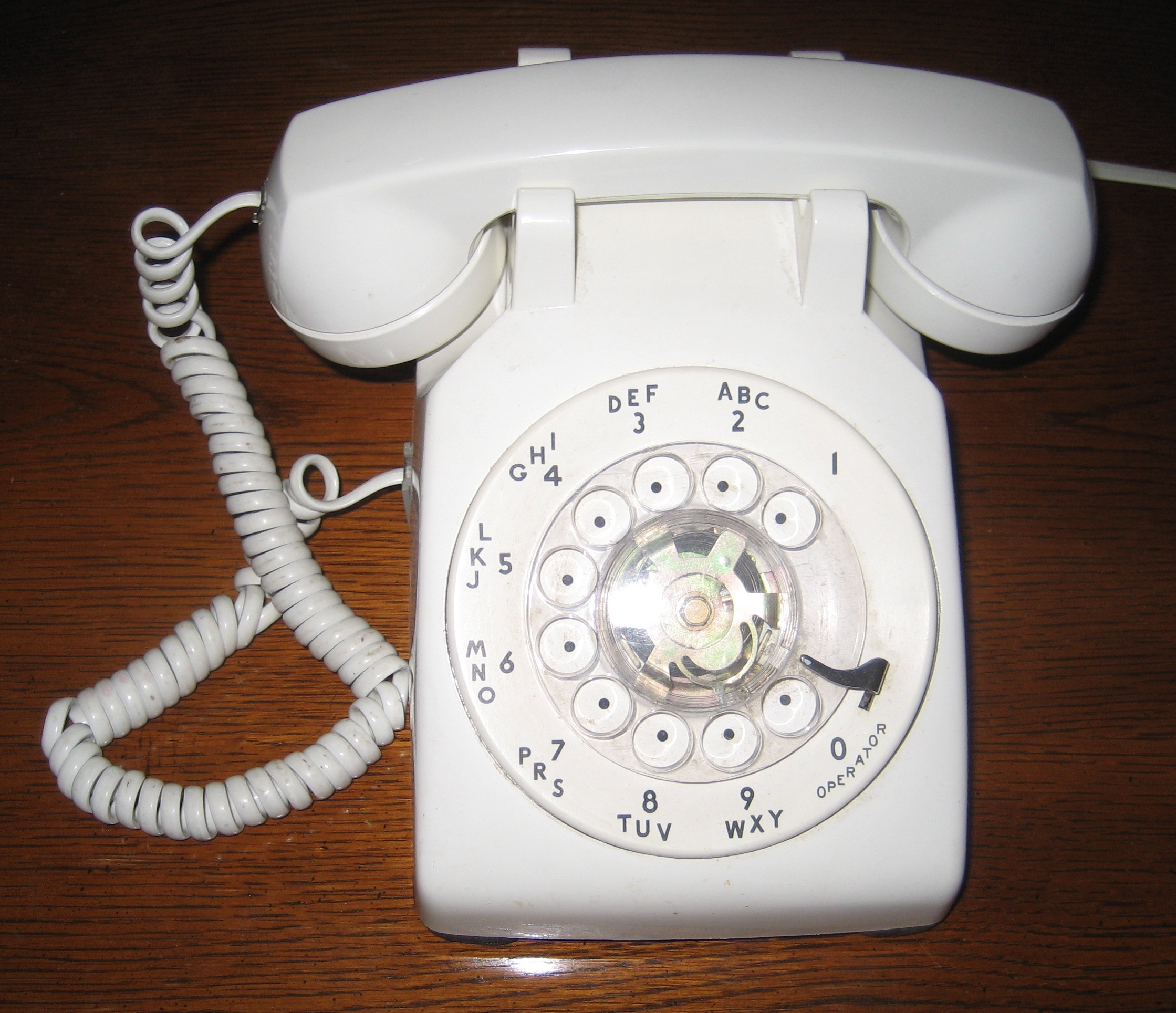
Western Electric model 500 telephone

In 1926, Western Electric issued the first Bell System telephone with a handset containing both the transmitter and receiver in the same unit. Previous telephones had been of the candlestick type which featured a stationary transmitter in the desktop set or the wall-mounted unit, and a hand-held receiver to be placed on the user's ear. The first version of the desktop unit was constructed by shortening the candlestick shaft to about an inch in height and placing a handset cradle on the top. This was the A-type handset mounting, which was replaced by 1928 by the B handset mounting, which featured a streamlined shape integrating the shaft as a short neck for the cradle. It still had the same circular footprint of the candlestick, which proved too unstable when dialing numbers, and was henceforth replaced with a wider design using an oval footprint, the D-type base in 1930.

Concurrently with the mechanical advances, the electrical circuitry of Western Electric telephones saw advances in sidetone reduction. Sidetone is feedback by which the users of the telephone can hear their own voice in the receiver. While a desirable property, this feedback, when too loud, causes most users to lower their voice volume to unacceptable levels. Until after the introduction in 1930 of the D handset mountings, sets still contained no active sidetone compensation. Such handset telephone types were designated with the assembly code 102, while later models containing anti-sidetone circuitry were the type 202 telephone set. These early desktop telephones relied on an additional desk set box or subscriber set (subset) containing the ringer with gongs, the induction coil, and capacitors to interface with the telephone network. These subscriber sets were typically mounted on a wall near the operating location for the telephone.

In 1936 the model 302 telephone was announced, which was the first Western Electric instrument that combined the desktop telephone set with the subscriber set and ringer in one unit. It became the mainstay of American telephone service well into the 1950s, and was followed by the model 500 telephone starting in 1950, which became the most extensively produced telephone model in the industry's history. The 500-set was continually updated over time, reflecting new materials and manufacturing processes, such as quieter and smoother dial gearing and a printed circuit board for the network electronics. The model 500 was discontinued in 1986, in favor of the type 2500, that had been available since 1969. The 2500-series employed dual-tone multi-frequency (DTMF) signaling for transmitting digits to the central office, replacing the rotary dial. DTMF technology was referred to by the trademark Touch-Tone.

Further innovations were evident when in 1954, the production of color telephones began to outproduce the black sets. Later, for 1958, production of the nite-light telephone, the Speakerphone, and the CALL DIRECTOR telephone were done at Indianapolis Works. Other innovations included the Princess telephones of the 1960s, followed shortly by the Trimline models.

Western Electric's switching equipment development commenced in the mid-1910s with the rotary system and the panel switch, later several generations of cross-bar switches, and finally the development of several generations of electronic switching systems (ESS). The No. 1 ESS was first installed in 1965. The 4ESS was the first digital toll switching system, implemented in 1976. Finally, in 1981, the 5ESS was implemented throughout the United States.

In 1929, Western Electric entered as a market competitor for early cinema sound systems. It created the Western Electric Universal Base, a device by which early silent cinema projectors could be adapted to screen sound films. Western Electric designed a wide-audio-range horn loudspeaker for cinemas. This was estimated to be 25% efficient, thus allowing a cinema to be filled with sound from a 3-watt amplifier. This was an important breakthrough in 1929 because high-powered audio valves (tubes) were not generally available.

In addition to being a supplier to the Bell System, Western Electric played a major role in the development and production of professional sound recording and reproducing equipment, including:

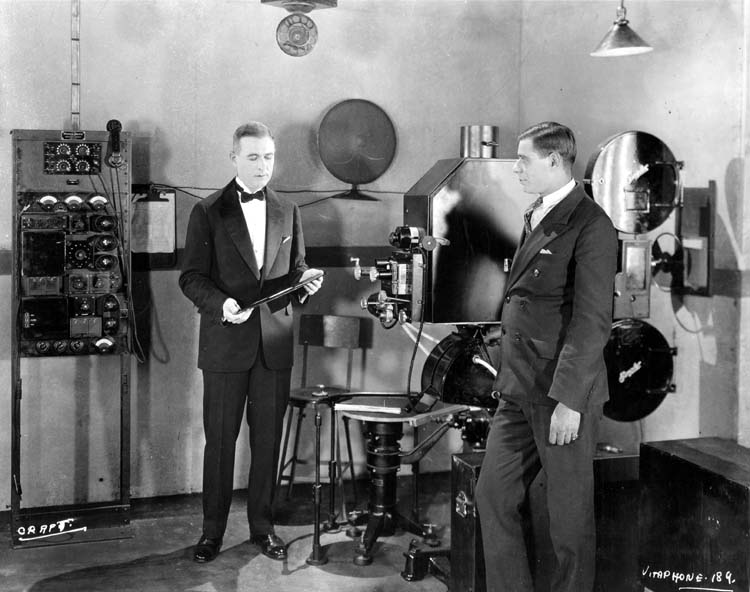
Engineer E. B. Craft holding a soundtrack disc during a demo of the Vitaphone projector in 1926

- the Vitaphone system which brought sound to the movies;
- the electrical recording technology adopted by record companies in the late 1920s (despite the popular electrical system used by Autograph Records and its manager, Orlando R. Marsh);
- the Orthophonic phonograph, an acoustical phonograph with a flat frequency response tailored for reproduction of electrically recorded disks;
- the Westrex (variable density) optical sound that succeeded it for motion picture film production and release prints;
- the Westrex magnetic sound (mono and stereo) that succeeded it for motion picture film production and a few productions' release prints;
- the Westrex stereo variable-area optical sound that succeeded it for low-cost stereo release prints;
- the Westrex (Model 3, and derivatives) cutter and system for recording stereophonic sound in a single-groove gramophone record (StereoDisk®) that was compatible with monophonic equipment.

For these reasons, many American films of this period feature the Western Electric/Westrex logo in their on-screen credits.

In 1950, at the start of the Cold War, Western Electric was selected to build the first demonstrator for the SOSUS anti-submarine sound surveillance system. Later, the company was prime contractor for the Safeguard anti-ballistic missile system, which operated briefly from 1975.

== Manufacturing innovations ==
Western Electric also invested heavily in improving processes and equipment to manufacture their products.

In 1958, the company established the Engineering Research Center (ERC) near Princeton, New Jersey. With a charter distinct from Bell Labs, Western Electric's ERC was one of the first research organizations solely dedicated to the advancement of manufacturing-focused, rather than product-focused science. Here, more than 400 researchers and engineers worked to bring new manufacturing technologies into the company's production environment. Their developments included computer-driven mathematical models and related statistical quality-control systems to improve production flow and logistics, novel metal-forming techniques, circuit board assembly automation, fiber-optic waveguide manufacturing techniques, application of lasers for industrial processes and early efforts in cleanroom robotics for semiconductor production. In the early 1970s, some of the first practical Ion Implanters to make integrated circuits were also developed at ERC and later deployed at Western Electric's chip-making factories.

Although the ERC was later integrated into Bell Labs, it – along with AT&T's nearby Corporate Education Center – was closed by the late 1990s, victims of the deregulation of telecommunications, shrinking revenues from long-distance calls and accelerating innovation in telephone equipment by an increasing number of global manufacturing players.

== Management innovations ==
- Western Electric were pioneers of the scientific management of Frederick Winslow Taylor.
- Walter A. Shewhart developed the control chart at the Hawthorne Works in 1924.
- Joseph M. Juran pioneered the use of statistical analysis for quality assurance at the Hawthorne Works.
- At Hawthorne Works, Cicero, Illinois, Elton Mayo conducted research of the effect on manufacturing productivity of lighting changes and work structure changes, such as working hours or break times. The reactivity identified in the studies became known as the Hawthorne effect.
- The Hawthorne experiments in industrial productivity were conducted there from 1924 to 1936.
- Western Electric's reputation for sound management was such that in 1949 President Truman requested that Western Electric manage a major defense laboratory, Sandia National Labs.

== National defense and Nike-Zeus ==
Western Electric was authorized on November 15, 1955, with Air Force Contract AF33(616)-3285 to conduct a competitive study directed solely to anti-ICBM (AICBM) defense. In February 1957, the U.S. Army awarded the company, as a contractor, responsibility in developing an AICBM defense system called Nike Zeus. On February 12, 1959, a test program for Nike-Zeus was approved by Department of Defense for Kwajalein as the down-range test site. After the site was inspected on August 4, 1959, by Western Electric project managers and various agencies/contractors, the completion of the technical building and launch facilities were done. Shortly after, Western Electric equipment engineers and installers arrived for the installation of the NIKE-ZEUS test site. The North Carolina plant made the R&D models for the system elements and installed, tested, and operated the components at the test site.

== NASA and Project Mercury ==
In 1960, NASA awarded Western Electric a contract for over $33,000,000 (equivalent to $359,139,483 in 2025) for engineering and construction of a tracking system for the Project Mercury program. As part of this effort, Western Electric engineers trained remote-site flight controllers and Project Mercury Control Center and operations personnel.

== Closure ==
As of January 1, 1984, a newly formed company, AT&T Technologies, Inc., assumed the corporate charter of Western Electric, which was split into several divisions, each focusing on a particular type of customer, e.g., AT&T Technology Systems, and AT&T Network Systems. Telephones made by Western Electric prior to the breakup continued to be manufactured and marked with the company emblem, however, lacking the Bell System logo, or having it hidden by metal filler inside of all telephone housings and most components, including new electronic integrated circuits with the initials WE. Electronic switching systems, outside plant materials, and other equipment produced for the consumption of the RBOCs continued to be marked "AT&T Western Electric" well into the 1990s.

Cost-cutting measures resulted in the consumer telephones being redesigned and modernized in 1985, as well as more plastic being used in place of metal in the 500 & 2500 series phones, as well as the Princess. In 1986, the Indianapolis Works telephone plant closed, and US production of AT&T single-line home telephones ended. Business telephones and systems continued production in the Shreveport Works plant until 2001. Home telephones were redesigned, and production was moved to Hong Kong, Singapore, China, and Thailand. Western Electric no longer marked housings of telephones with "WE", but continued to mark the modular plugs of telephone cords with "WE".

Western Electric came to an end in 1995 when AT&T changed the name of AT&T Technologies to Lucent Technologies, in preparation for its spinoff. Lucent became independent in 1996, and sold more assets into Advanced American Telephones, Agere Systems, Avaya, and Consumer Phone Services. Lucent itself merged with Alcatel, forming Alcatel-Lucent, which was acquired by Nokia in 2016. Western Electric's structured cabling unit, once known as AT&T Network Systems or SYSTIMAX, was spun off from Avaya and became part of CommScope.

== Subsequent developments ==
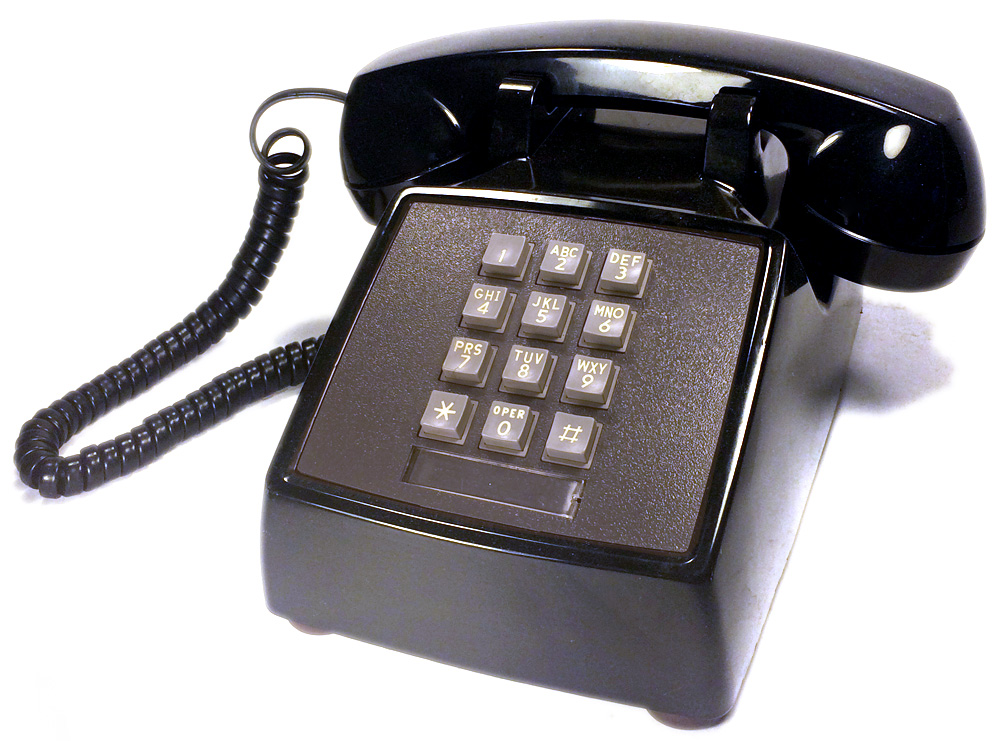
AT&T push-button telephone made by Western Electric, model 2500 DMG black (1980)

Since the demise of Western Electric, telephone equipment design and manufacturing is an open market place in which numerous manufacturers compete. As a result, modern telephones are now manufactured in Asia, generally using less expensive components and labor.

Some telephone subscribers declined to purchase their existing telephones after the AT&T breakup, and continued to lease their existing Western Electric models from QLT Consumer Lease Services, formerly known as AT&T Consumer Lease Services. Such subscribers paid leasing fees for their telephones far in excess of the purchase price, but the phones were perceived by some users to be superior to telephones commonly made today in aspects of durability and sound quality. Today, many of these Western Electric telephones have become collector's items.

Western Electric's audio equipment from the 1920s and 30s, designed to be used in movie theaters, is now prized by collectors and audiophiles due to its quality construction and sound reproduction. This includes its massive horn loudspeakers designed to fill a large theater with sound from a relatively low-powered tube amplifier.

=== Name acquisition ===
In 1995, the license to manufacture vacuum tubes, audio equipment, and the stylized brand name Western Electric trademark was acquired by Western Electric Export Corporation, a privately owned high-end audio company in Rossville, Georgia. The company specializes in manufacturing vacuum tubes and high end audio equipment. Amongst other products, the company has revived the Western Electric 300B electron tube.

== Publications ==
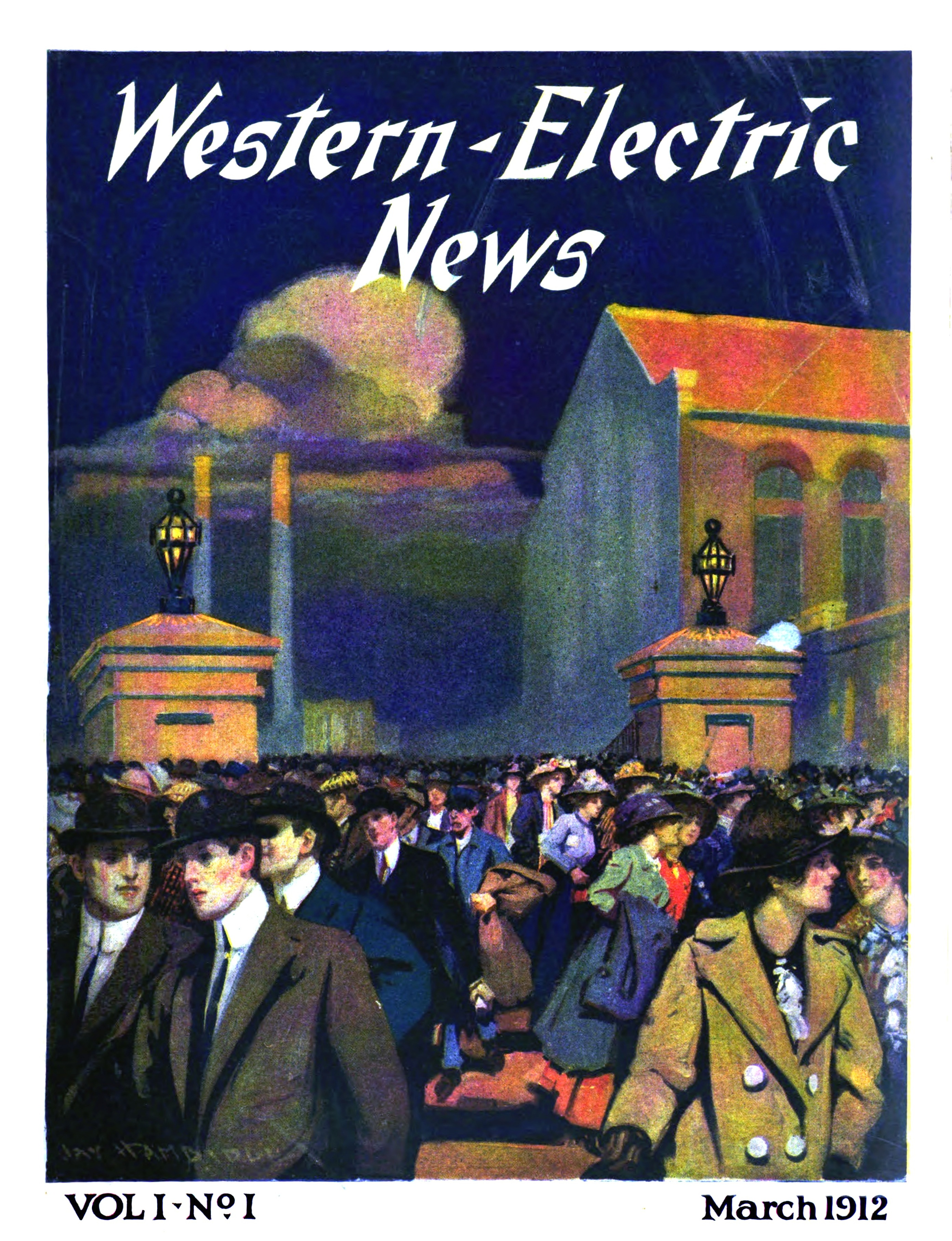
Inaugural issue cover of first Western Electric employee magazine in March 1912

During the span of its existence of over a dozen decades, Western Electric published a variety of publications for various audiences, including periodicals for employees and customers.

The first employee magazine was Western Electric News, commencing in March 1912 (Volume 1, Number 1) under company president Harry Bates Thayer. Its purpose was to provide a forum where ideas could be exchanged, the company events and activities could be recorded, and to serve as clearing house for technical and commercial information of value to the employee.

In November 1935, Western Electric published a magazine, Pickups, for its developments in sound transmissions, mostly for its radio and communications customers. The magazine changed its name to Oscillator after the May 1942 issue was published and returned in September 1944 with the issue after a hiatus. There are approximately thirty-three issues archived of Western Electric's radio history up to November 1948.

In 1948, Western Electric began publishing the monthly house magazine WE for employees of the company. The magazine was published into the 1980s.

Starting in 1957, Western Electric published The Western Electric Engineer (ISSN 0043-3659), later known as The Engineer, on a subscription basis.

== Educational films ==
Western Electric produced many educational and marketing films that focused on the products associated with telephony or the company's inventions. For example,

- "Finding His Voice" (1929) is an animated cartoon produced by Fleischer Studios. The animation shows using a sound booth to pick up sound on a microphone. It also explains the process of using a machine to record sound to film. The cartoon shows a picture and sound projector called the Vitaphone, which was invented in 1926 and sold to Warner Bros. Pictures, but had its exclusivity rights lapsed by 1929.
- "Bottling Electrons" (1930s) is a treatise on the manufacture of vacuum tubes.
- "A Miracle for Mrs. Smith" (1940s) is a film showing "how the Bell telephone system works and how Western Electric manufactures the materials and products used in the telephone industry."
- "Adventure In Telezonia" (1950) is a puppet film intended to teach proper telephone usage. It uses puppets by Bil Baird.
- "A Family Affair" (1955) is a promotional film about using telephones in a home environment. There is an appearance by actor Steve McQueen.
- "Tools of Telephony" version 1 (1956) introduced telephones, cables, and switching frames that were made, installed, warehoused, or bought by Western Electric. The film promoted the manufacturing and supply unit for the Bell System with twenty-one manufacturing locations, seventeen installation areas, twenty-nine distribution chain warehouses, and purchasing systems for its plants and operating companies.
- "Tools of Telephony" version 2 (1958) introduced the teletype, remote feeding of electronic brain calculators, nationwide television transmission, remote control of systems for industry, and telephones. It promoted the manufacturing and supply unit for the Bell System with manufacturing locations, seventeen installation areas, a purchasing system, and a chain of distribution houses.
- "Speedy Cutover Service" (1984) showed an electronic switching system.

== Notable employees ==
Employees	Notes
Harold D. Arnold	In April 1913, developed amplified sound in a high-vacuum tube for telephone cables using expertise in electron physics.
Edward Craft	Worked at the company from 1902 until 1929. In the 1920s, made the decision for the company to work on sound systems for the moving picture industry. Held 70 patents in electrical communication.
W. Edwards Deming	Worked with Shewhart and Juran to become the three founders of the quality improvement movement. A continuous improvement method of management and policy was called the Deming cycle, commonly known as the Plan–Do–Check–Act (PDCA) cycle. The Deming Prize was established in honor of Deming's help with statistical quality control in Japan.
George Halas	A summer hire at Hawthorne Works and a player of company sports, was late arriving to the summer picnic on the 1915 S.S. Eastland disaster. After Western Electric, was one of the founders of the National Football League and the coach for the Chicago Bears.
Betty Hall	Worked producing vacuum tubes during World War II. After leaving the company in 1944, served in the New Hampshire House of Representatives for 28 years.
Beatrice Alice Hicks	In 1942 became Western Electric's first female engineer. Worked on long-distance telephone technology and developed a crystal oscillator, utilized for aircraft communications that generated radio frequencies. Attended Columbia University for courses in electrical engineering while working at Kearny Works. Left Western Electric in 1945 and became a consultant.
Mervin Kelly	Started at Western Electric in 1918 as a physicist with the research division of the engineering department before it become Bell Laboratories. Retired from Bell Laboratories on March 1, 1959, with scientific and administrative service. At Bell Labs, served as director of vacuum tube development and as development director of electronics and transmission instruments, before being director of research in 1936. Served on the Bell Laboratories board of directors beginning in 1944, and was a director of the Sandia Corporation from 1952 through 1958. Was Board of Directors for Tung-Sol about 1959.
Alexander M. Nicolson	Engineer who in 1917, while at Western Electric, created the first crystal oscillator using a piece of Rochelle salt.
Joseph A. Beirne	In 1927, started at Western Electric. Became president of National Federation of Telephone Workers union in 1943 that he organized earlier in 1938. Became founding president of Communications Workers of America (CWA) in 1948, that he organized, after a telephone strike a year earlier. Held presidency at CWA until June 1974. The Joseph Anthony Beirne Foundation was created by CWA, honoring his ideas of social causes and education through scholarship program. In 2000, he became an inductee of the U.S. Department of Labor Hall of Honor.

== Bibliography ==
- Adams, Stephen B.; Butler, Orville R. (January 28, 1999). Manufacturing the Future: A History of Western Electric. Cambridge University Press. ISBN 0-521-65118-2.
- Fagen, M. D., ed. (1975). A History of Engineering and Science in the Bell System. Vol. 1: The Early Years (1875–1925). New York: The [Bell Telephone] Laboratories. ISBN 0-932764-02-9.
- Fagen, M. D., ed. (1978). A History of Engineering and Science in the Bell System. Vol. 2: National Service in War and Peace (1925–1975). New York: The [Bell Telephone] Laboratories. ISBN 0-932764-00-2.
- Iardella, Albert B., ed. (1964). Western Electric and the Bell System: A Survey of Service (PDF). Western Electric Company. Archived from the original (PDF) on September 5, 2020.
- Lovette, Frank (Winter 1944–1945). "Western Electric's First 75 Years: A Chronology". Bell Telephone Magazine. Vol. XXIII. New York: American Telephone and Telegraph Co.
