= Design Line telephone =

Line of American telephones

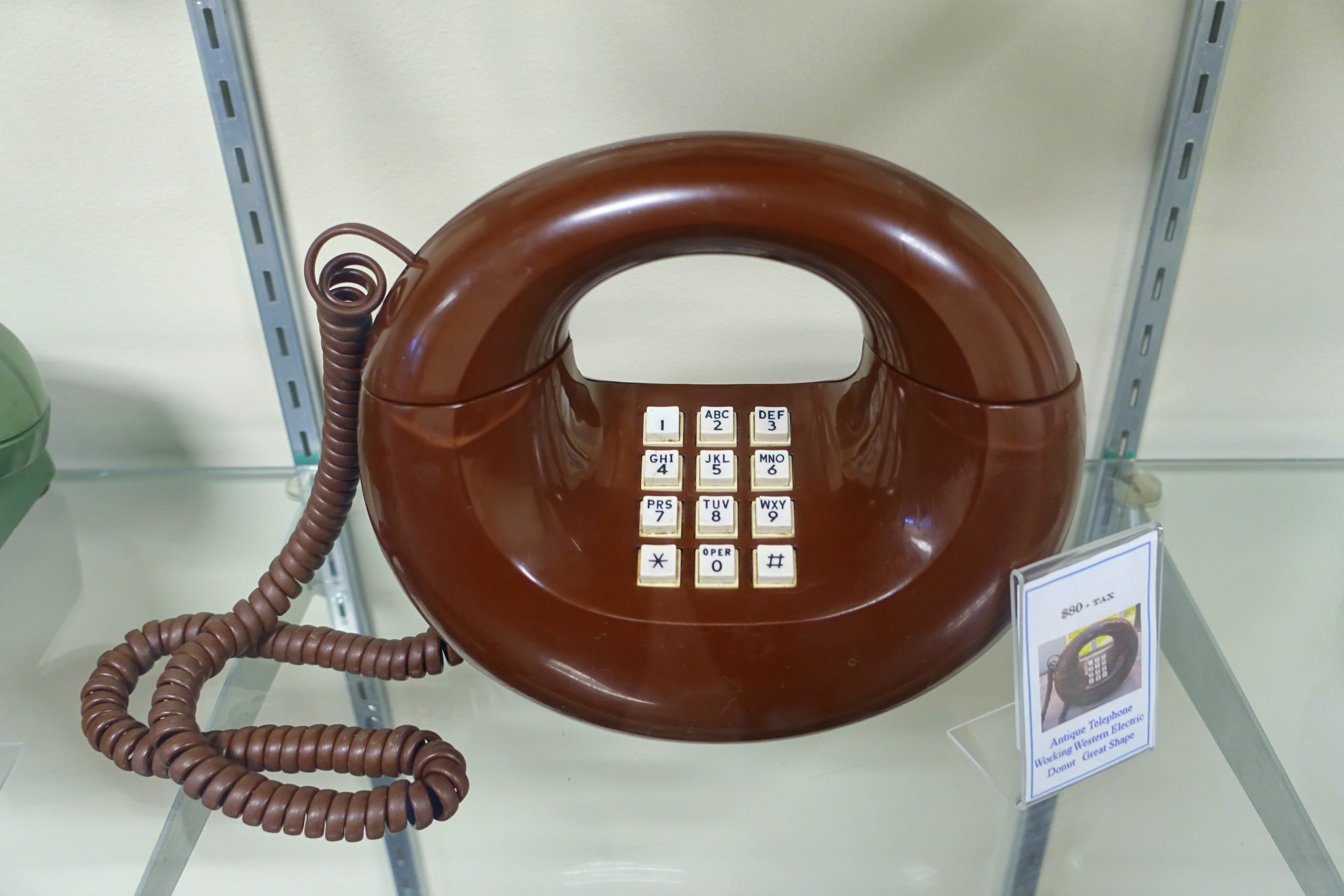
A brown Western Electric "Sculptura" Design Line telephone

Design Line is a brand name that AT&T has used for several of its specialty telephone designs to fulfill the demand by customers for more variety in telephone models.

== Pre-divestiture models ==
In the early 1970s, well before the Bell System divestiture, customers in increasing numbers chose to install and use telephones not manufactured by Western Electric, AT&T's wholly owned subsidiary. To fulfill the demand, the Bell System decided to offer a series of specialty telephones that could be purchased or leased. The series was called the Design Line telephones. The name did not refer to one particular telephone type; rather Design Line was the collective name given to all the specialty phones, including the Candlestick phone, Country Junction phone, Mickey Mouse phone and others. The phones were among the few that could be purchased in the early 1970s.

Western Electric broke tradition, by obtaining housings for some of the sets from other manufacturers or local contractors in Indianapolis. In all cases, Western Electric supplied the internal electrical components of the phones, such as ringer, receiver, transmitter, and induction coils. Early Design Line sets displayed this disclaimer:

"The telephone housing is your property. To assure quality of service, all working parts, e.g., dial, cords, and electrical components remain the property and responsibility of the Bell Telephone Company."

As a consequence, Bell customers still had to pay a monthly lease fee in order to rent the phone's internal components, which remained the property and responsibility of the local Bell provider. Design Line phones are among the few lines of phones produced by Western Electric that were more renowned for looks than durability. Because the majority of the Design Line phone housings were not made by Western Electric, Bell System standards were less stringent for exterior housings than for the phone's internals.

Beginning in around 1980, the Bell System allowed customers to own the entire phone, including internal components. Sets were marked with "CS" to indicate the phone was entirely customer owned.

Some Design Line sets had the option of rotary or touch-tone dialing others were only available with one or the other. The Design Line telephones available from the Bell Telephone Company around 1980 include:

- Antique Gold (French style cradlephone with ornate gold colored figures) (rotary only)
- Mediterranean (Spanish style cradlephone with wrought iron insignia and black/gold trim) (rotary only)
- Early American (Colonial style cradelphone with American Eagle insignia) (rotary only)
- Candlestick (resembles early telephones, available in black, ivory, stars and stripes and wood grained) (rotary only)
- Chestphone (telephone hidden in wooden chest available in carved simulated walnut with beige handset or black vinyl with walnut trim and a black handset) (rotary and touch-tone)
- Stowaway (telephone hidden in wooden box available in contemporary walnut with silver trim or Mediterranean styled oak with gold trim also a rolltop model was available) (rotary and touch-tone)
- Exeter (contemporary telephone available in brown or white with interchangeable face plates) (rotary and touch-tone)
- Sculptura (commonly referred to as the "doughnut" telephone due to its round shape, available in brown, white and yellow) (rotary and touch-tone)
- Telstar (futuristic telephone constructed of smoked acrylic and brushed chrome with a black base) (rotary and touch-tone)
- Noteworthy (wall telephone available with a chalk or cork board, featured Trimline handset, available in brown, rust orange, white and yellow) (rotary and touch-tone)
- Celebrity (elegant telephone designed for use in a bedroom, available in ivory with gold trim or light blue with silver trim) (originally rotary only, touch-tone made available later)
- Coquette (French style telephone with gold colored trim and a filigree brass plate that could be engraved for personalization) (rotary only)
- The Mickey Mouse Telephone (rotary and touch-tone)
- The Snoopy and Woodstock Telephone (rotary and touch-tone)
- The Winnie the-Pooh Telephone (rotary and touch-tone)
- Country Junction (resembles early oak wall telephones with antique nickel finished metal trim) (rotary only)
- The Americana Edition Wall Telephone (a modern reproduction of Western Electric's 1892 oak magneto wall set) (rotary only)

Other Design Line telephones available in the 1970s and early 1980s include:

- Accent (resembles a Princess phone, available in blue, green or yellow with wicker or detective paper inlay) (rotary and touch-tone)
- Big Button (desk or wall phone with large touch-tone keys) (touch-tone only)
- Country Squire (wood desk set with French style handset) (rotary and touch-tone)
- Elite (flat desk telephone available in green leather with gold trim and a green handset or brown leather with silver trim with a white handset. Also a commemorative model was available that could be adorned to commemorate an event, person etc.) (rotary and touch-tone)
- Glow Phone (light up version of the Big Button) (touch-tone only)
- Optique (resembles the Chestphone light beige chest with an abstract pattern painted on the top) (rotary and touch-tone)

The arrangement in which Western Electric components were installed into Japanese-made housings ended around the time of divestiture. Character phones, such as the Mickey Mouse phone, were made in China using the Trimline handset, rather than just the receiver with dial in the base. These phones were still sold as a part of the Design Line series.

== Post-divestiture models ==
In 1985, AT&T Technologies redesigned its consumer telephone products to be cheaper to build and be more competitive in the marketplace by adding electronic ringers and a redial function. In 1986, they moved telephone production out of the United States. After this time several new Design Line series telephones were marketed and discontinued. One example of a "Design Line" phone was model 140, marketed in the mid 90s. The phone was similar in size to the 2554 wall phone, but had unique features:

- Round buttons
- Round receiver/microphone
- Switchhook similar in shape to a slice of pie
- Desk or wall use

The phone also required a handset cord which had a long straight section as the connector to the base was located on the bottom of the phone, and not facing outward on the side.

In 2000, Lucent Technologies spun off its consumer telephone division, resulting in the Design Line being redesigned. The basic design was retained, except that the handset was more rectangular in shape, and an "AT&T" badge was placed on the outside of the handset. The phone also replaced the traditional 100 series (the 2500 and 2554 telephones) for consumer use, as Lucent kept the phones because of their high demand for business use after spinning off its consumer division.

== Gallery ==
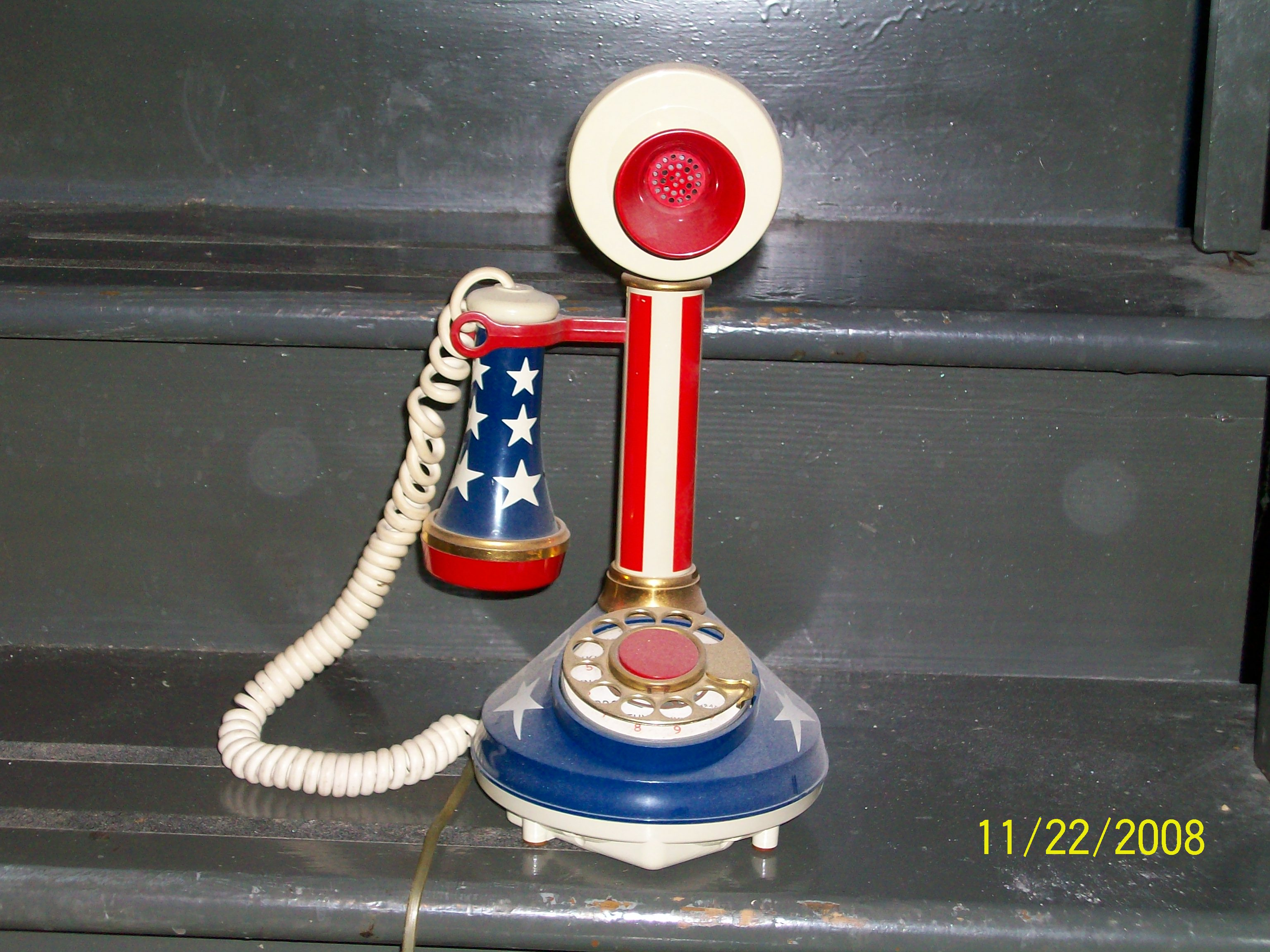
Rotary Candlestick model, in Stars and Stripes

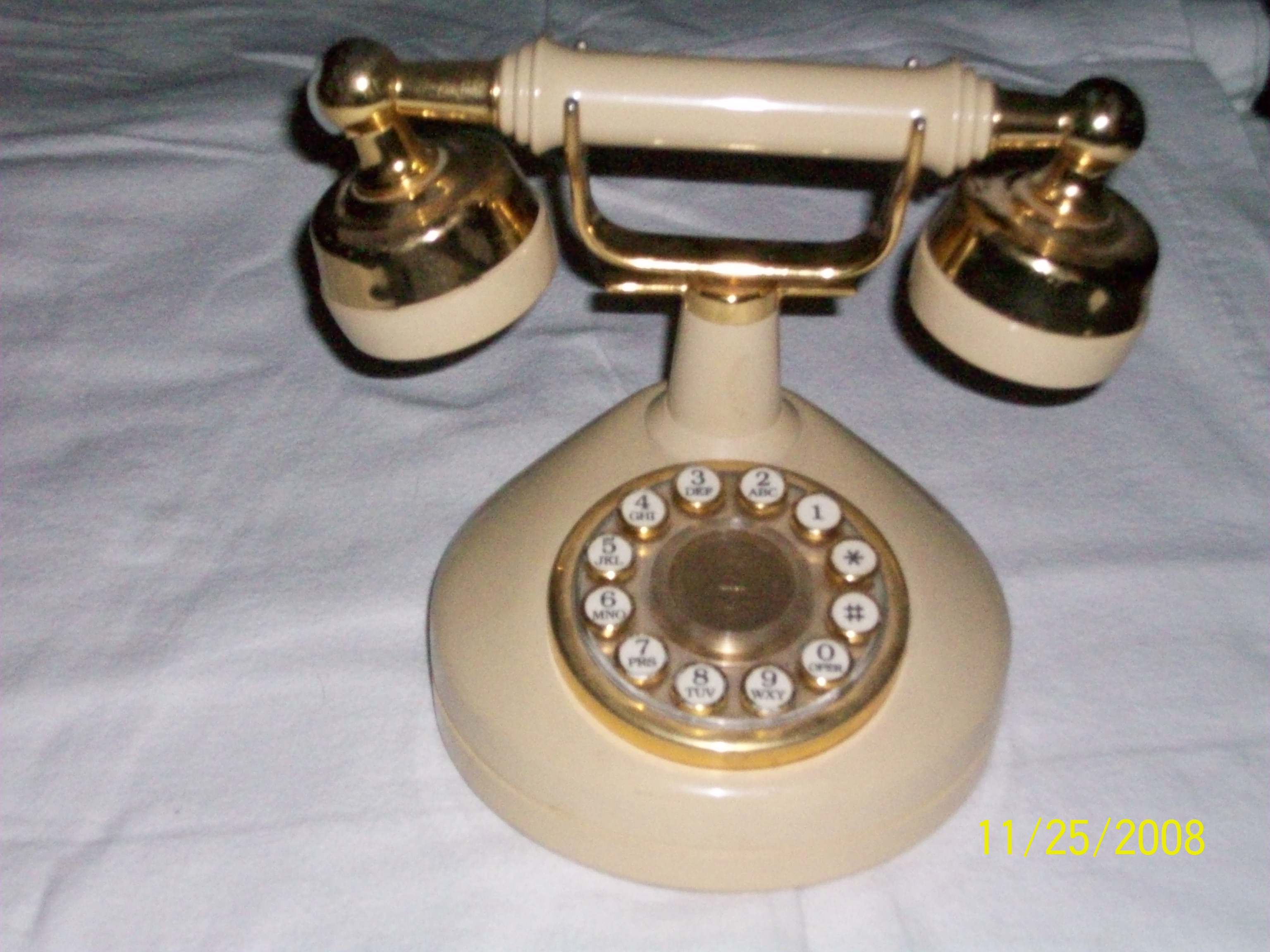
Touch tone Celebrity model, in ivory; on the hook

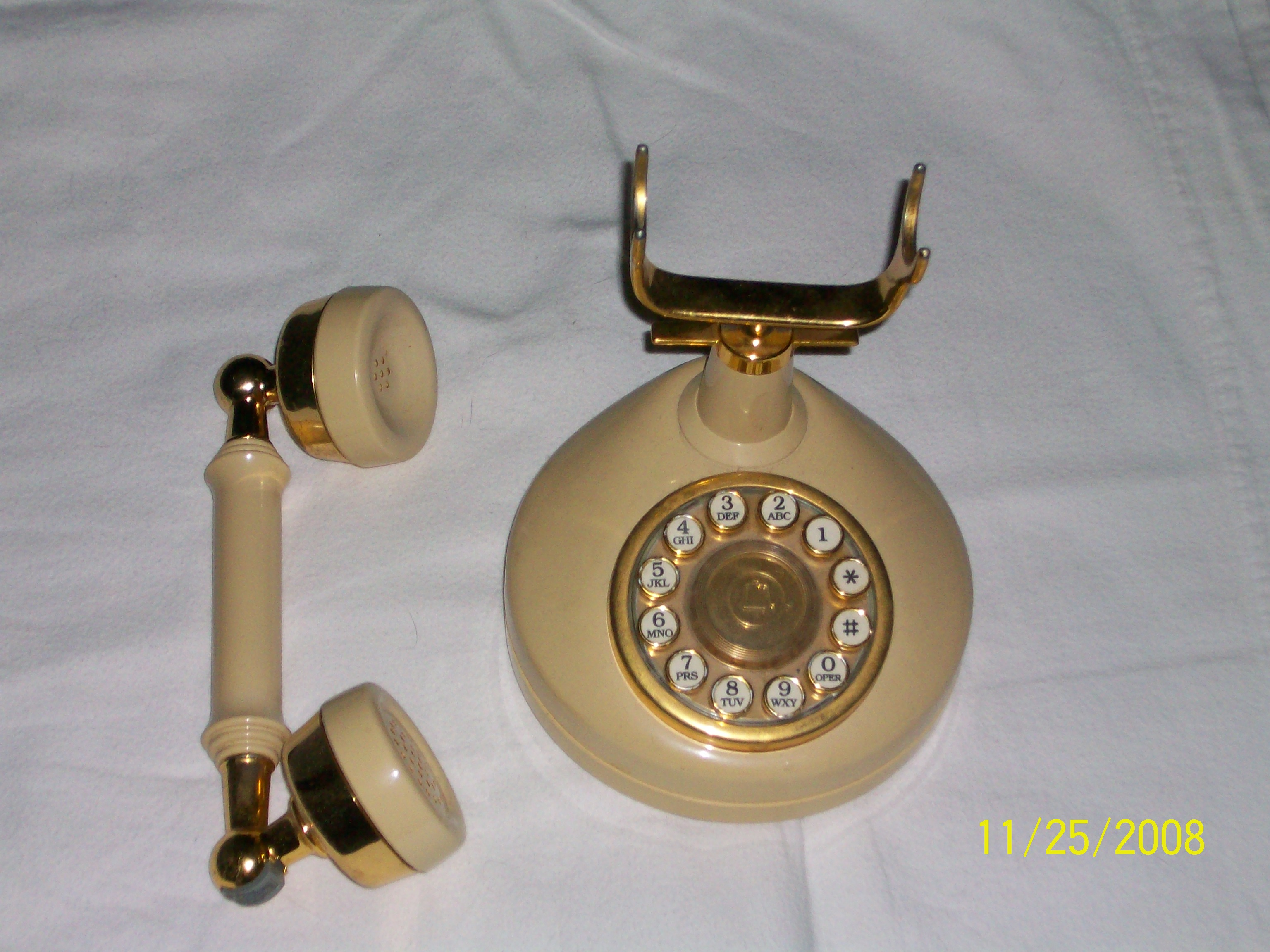
Touch tone Celebrity model, in ivory; off the hook

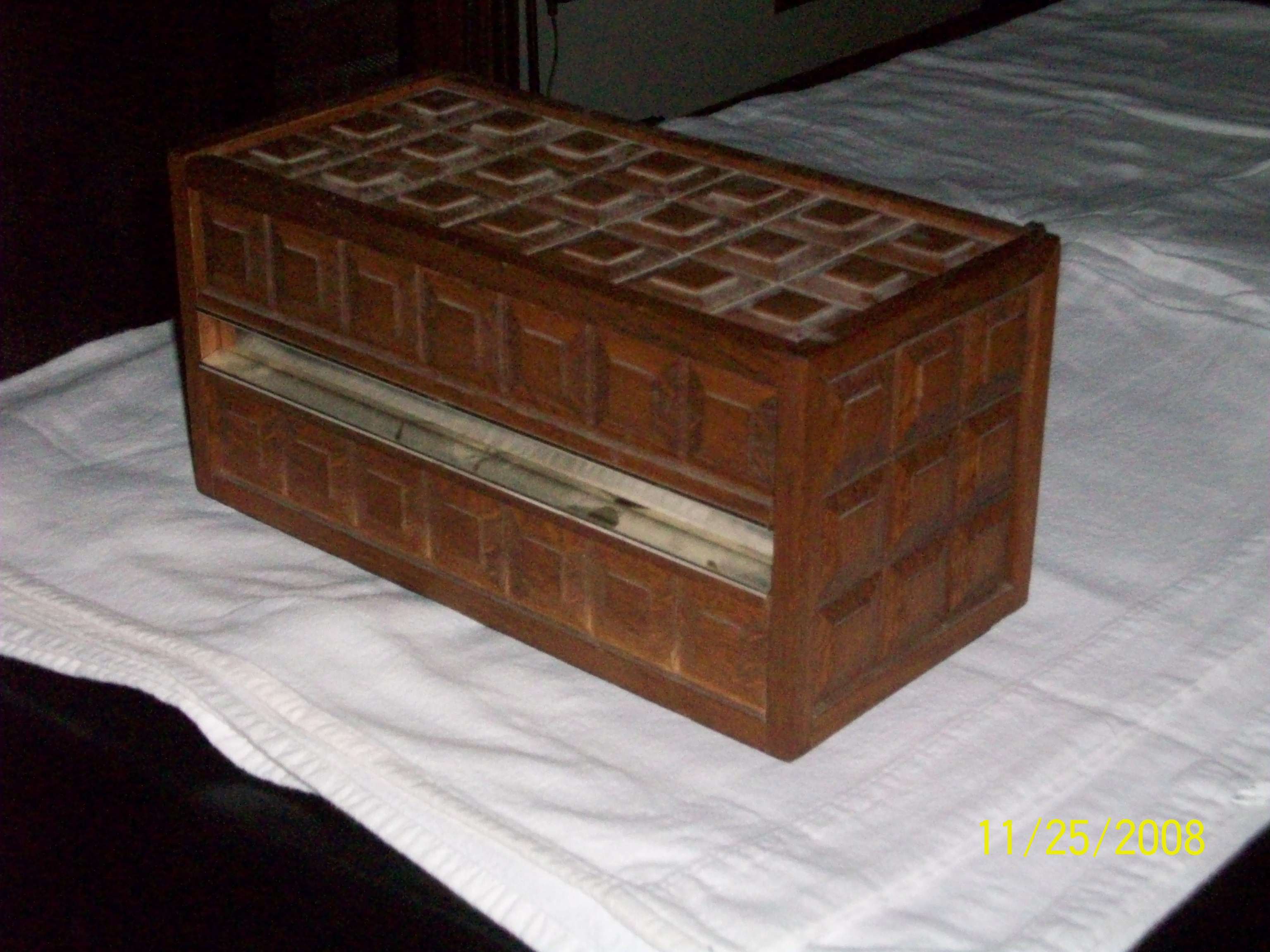
Touch tone Stowaway model, with "Mediterranean" finish; lid closed

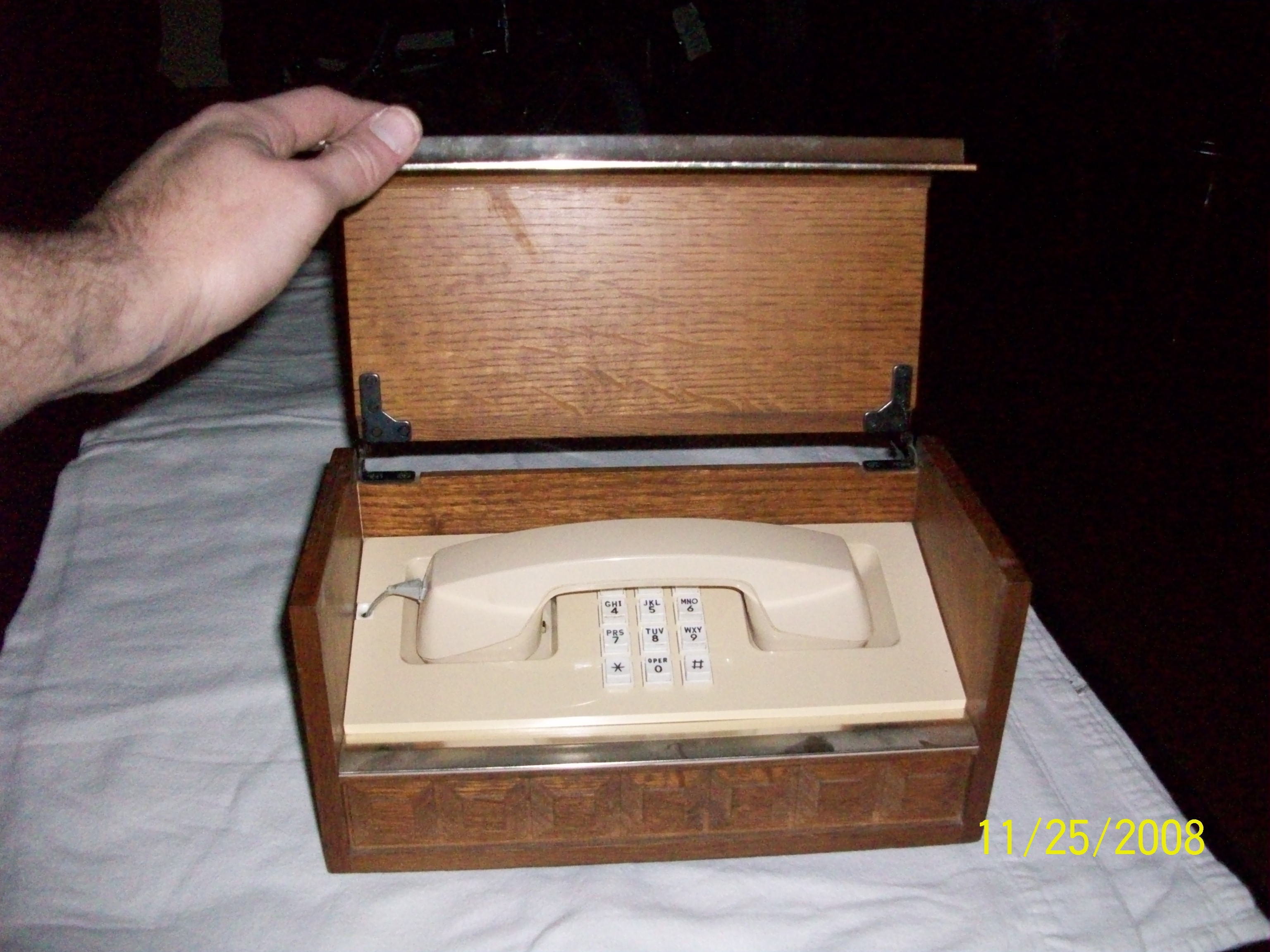
Touch tone Stowaway model, with "Mediterranean" finish; lid open

== See also ==
- Bell System Practices
