= QLT Consumer Lease Services =

New Jersey telephone equipment leasing company

QLT Consumer Lease Services, formerly AT&T Consumer Lease Services, is a New Jersey–based telephone equipment leasing company. The company provides telephone leasing services to residences and small businesses in the United States. These services include next business day replacement of the leased product for any reason.

QLT Consumer Lease Services also leases cordless phones, feature phones, answering machines & telephone accessories.

Customers of Consumer Phone Services, in 2019, number less than a hundred thousand. In 2007, some 580,000 customers still leased phones through the company. A majority of the customers are elderly who have found convenience in simply leasing the same telephone. Most customers are also leftovers from before the 1984 breakup of AT&T, who did not opt to purchase their telephones before the buyout option expired in 1987. One criticism in these cases has been that such customers have paid over ten times the value of the leased phone over the course of many years. Customers do retain the benefit of free replacement if the phone ever breaks and free accessories such as long cords.

On October 1, 2008, AT&T Consumer Lease Services changed its name to QLT Consumer Lease Services.
