= Index of telephone-related articles =

These are some of the links to articles that are telephone related.

== 0-9 ==
- 116 telephone number
- 800 number
- 999 (emergency telephone number)

== A-F ==
- Alexander Graham Bell
- Answering machine
- Antonio Meucci
- Area code
- Bell labs
- Bell System
- Carterfone
- Cell site
- Cellular network
- Charles Bourseul
- Clamshell design
- Cordless telephone
- Martin Cooper
- Demon Dialing
- Dial tone
- DynaTAC
- Elisha Gray
- Elisha Gray and Alexander Bell telephone controversy
- Emergency phone
- Emile Berliner
- Fax
- Federal telephone excise tax
- Francis Blake (telephone)

== G-L ==
- Geographic number
- Grillo telephone
- Harmonised service of social value
- History of mobile phones
- History of the telephone
- Telephone in United States history
- Hybrid routing
- Innocenzo Manzetti
- Invention of the telephone
- Jipp curve
- Local loop

== M-R ==
- Mobile phone
- Mobile Phone Museum
- Philipp Reis
- Phreaking
- Plain old telephone service (POTS)
- Private branch exchange
- Public switched telephone network
- Rate center
- Regional Bell Operating Company
- Ringaround

== S-Z ==
- Satellite phone
- Sidetone
- StarTAC
- Telecommunications
- Telephone
- Telephone call
- Telephone directory
- Telephone exchange
- Telephone line
- Telephone newspaper
- Telephone number
- Telephone switchboard
- Telephone tapping
- Telephony
- Thomas Edison
- Timeline of the telephone
- Tip and ring (Wiring terminology)
- Toll-free telephone number
- Zone Usage Measurement

== See also ==
- Category:Telephony
