= Telephone =

Telecommunications device

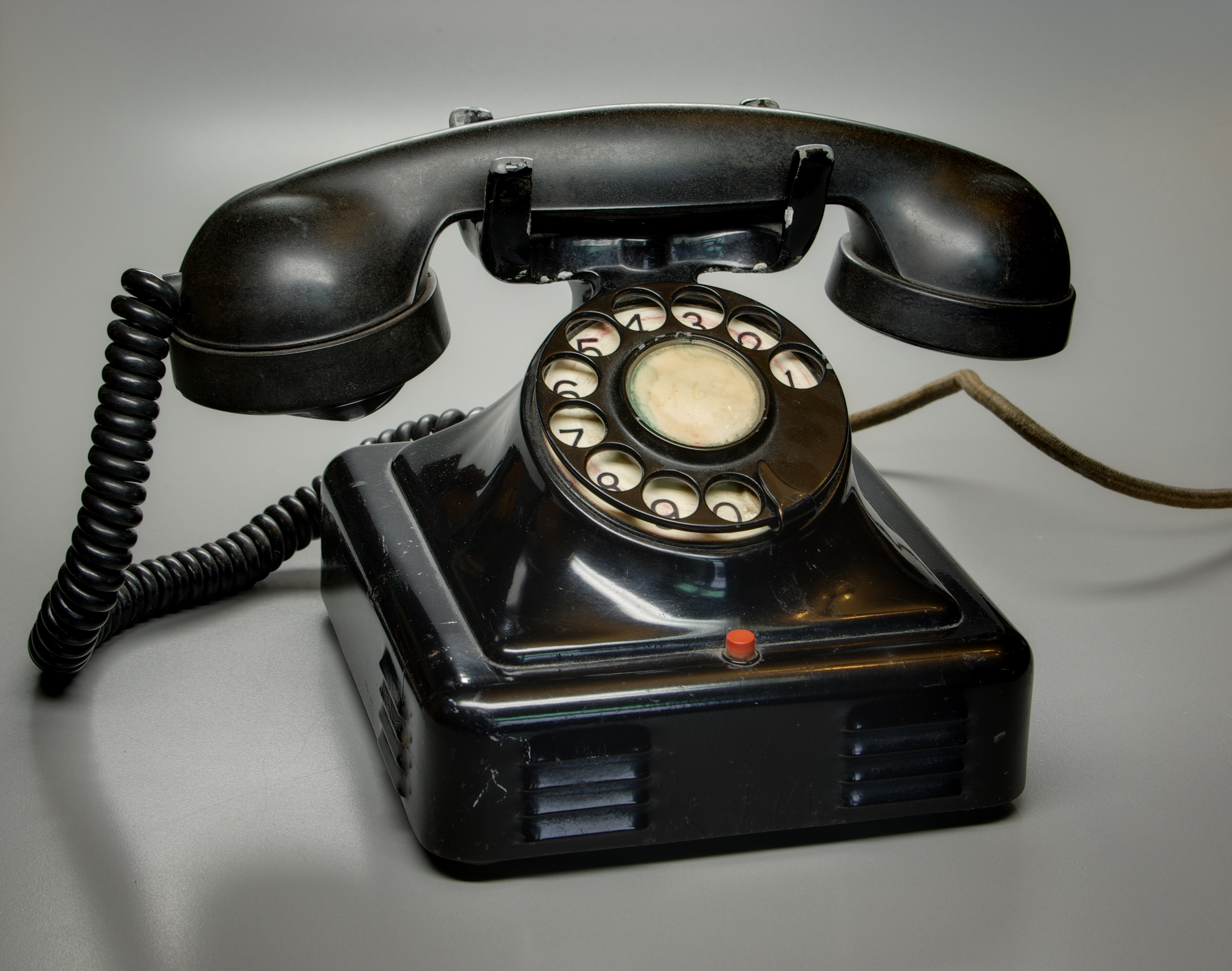
An old rotary dial telephone

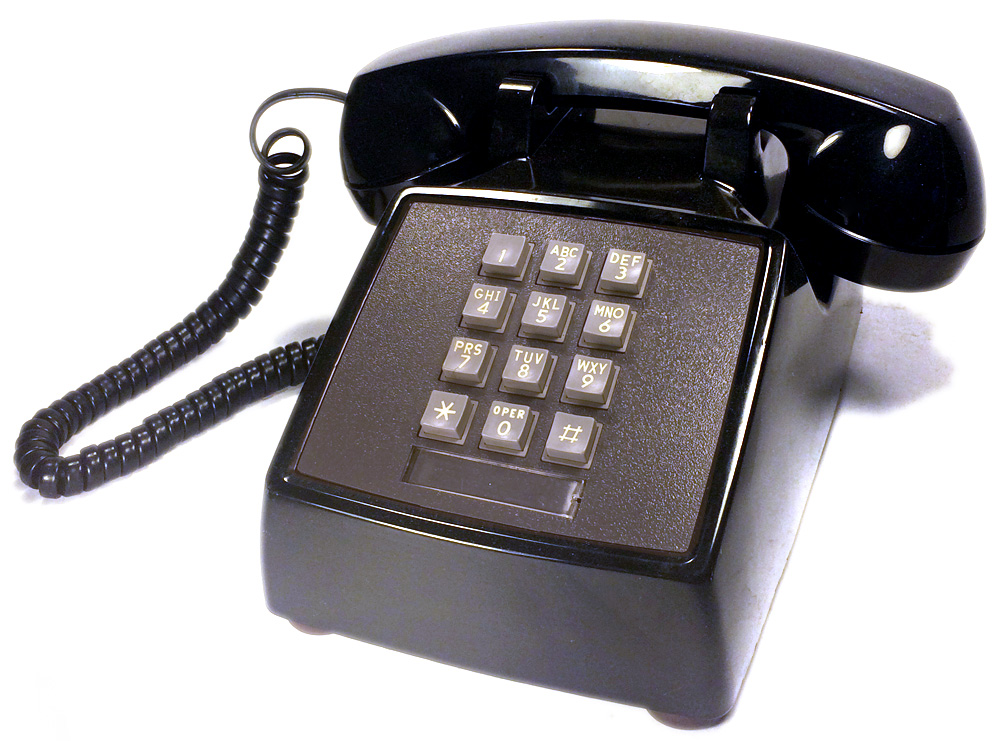
AT&T push button telephone made by Western Electric, model 2500 DMG black, 1980

A telephone, commonly shortened to phone, is a telecommunications device that enables two or more users to conduct a conversation when they are too far apart to be easily heard directly. A telephone converts sound, typically and most efficiently the human voice, into electronic signals that are transmitted via cables and other communication channels to another telephone which reproduces the sound to the receiving user. The term is derived from Ancient Greek: τῆλε, romanized: tēle, lit. 'far' and φωνή (phōnē, voice), together meaning distant voice.

In 1876, Alexander Graham Bell was the first to be granted a United States patent for a device that produced clearly intelligible replication of the human voice at a second device. This instrument was further developed by many others, and became rapidly indispensable in business, government, and in households.

The essential elements of a telephone are a microphone (transmitter) to speak into and an earphone (receiver) which reproduces the voice at a distant location. The receiver and transmitter are usually built into a handset which is held up to the ear and mouth during conversation. The transmitter converts the sound waves to electrical signals which are sent through the telecommunications system to the receiving telephone, which converts the signals into audible sound in the receiver or sometimes a loudspeaker. Telephones permit transmission in both directions simultaneously.

Most telephones also contain an alerting feature, such as a ringer or a visual indicator, to announce an incoming telephone call. Telephone calls are initiated most commonly with a keypad or dial, affixed to the telephone, to enter a telephone number, which is the address of the call recipient's telephone in the telecommunications system, but other methods existed in the early history of the telephone.

The first telephones were directly connected to each other from one customer's office or residence to another customer's location. Being impractical beyond just a few customers, these systems were quickly replaced by manually operated centrally located switchboards. These exchanges were soon connected together, eventually forming an automated, worldwide public switched telephone network. For greater mobility, various radio systems were developed in the mid-20th century for transmission between mobile stations on ships and in automobiles.

Handheld mobile phones were introduced for personal service starting in 1973. In later decades, the analog cellular system evolved into digital networks with greater capability and lower cost. Convergence in communication services has provided a broad spectrum of capabilities in cell phones, including mobile computing, giving rise to the smartphone, the dominant type of telephone in the world today.

Modern telephones exist in various forms and are implemented through different systems, including fixed-line, cellular, satellite, and Internet-based devices, all of which are integrated into the public switched telephone network (PSTN). This interconnected system allows any telephone, regardless of its underlying technology or geographic location, to reach another through a unique telephone number. While mobile and landline services are fully integrated into the global telecommunication network, some Internet-based services, such as VoIP, may not always be directly connected to the PSTN, though they still allow communication across different systems when a connection is made.

== Early history ==
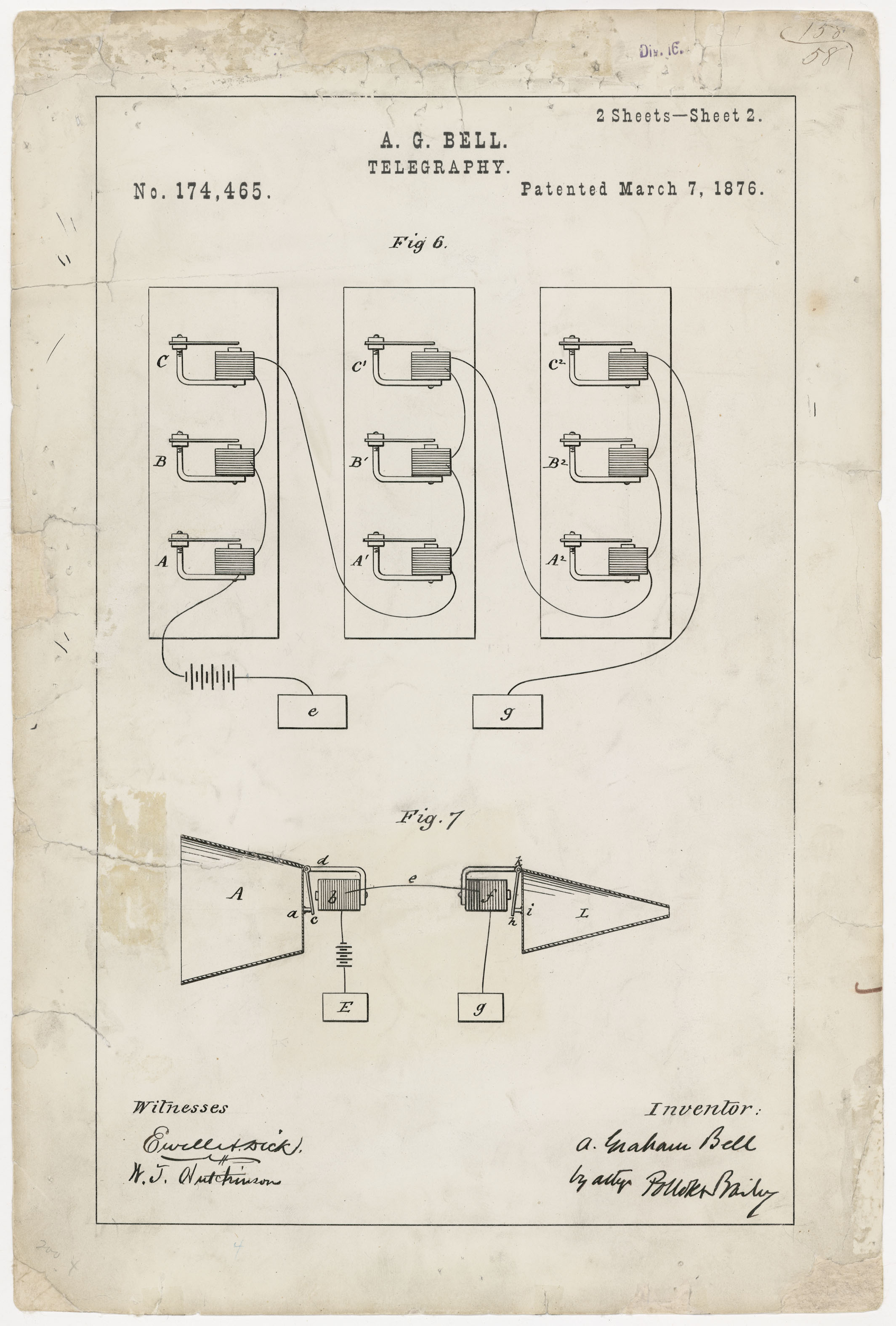
Alexander Graham Bell's Telephone Patent Drawing (1876)

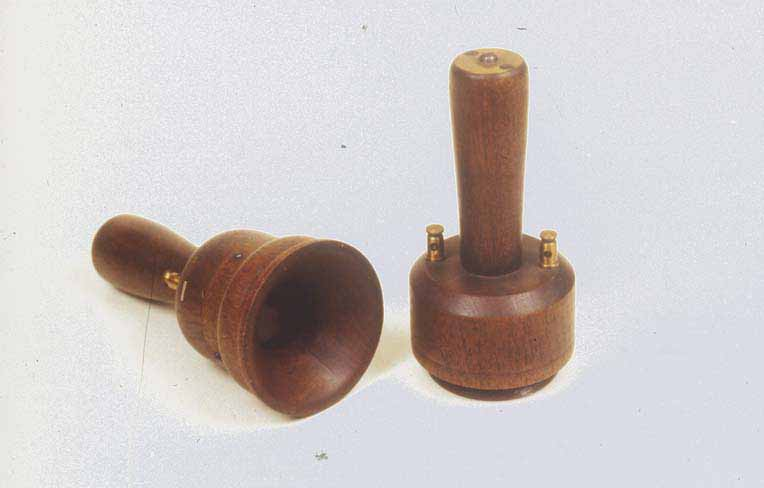
Replica of the telettrofono at Museo Nazionale Scienza e Tecnologia Leonardo da Vinci of Milan, Italy, invented by Antonio Meucci and credited by several sources as the first telephone.

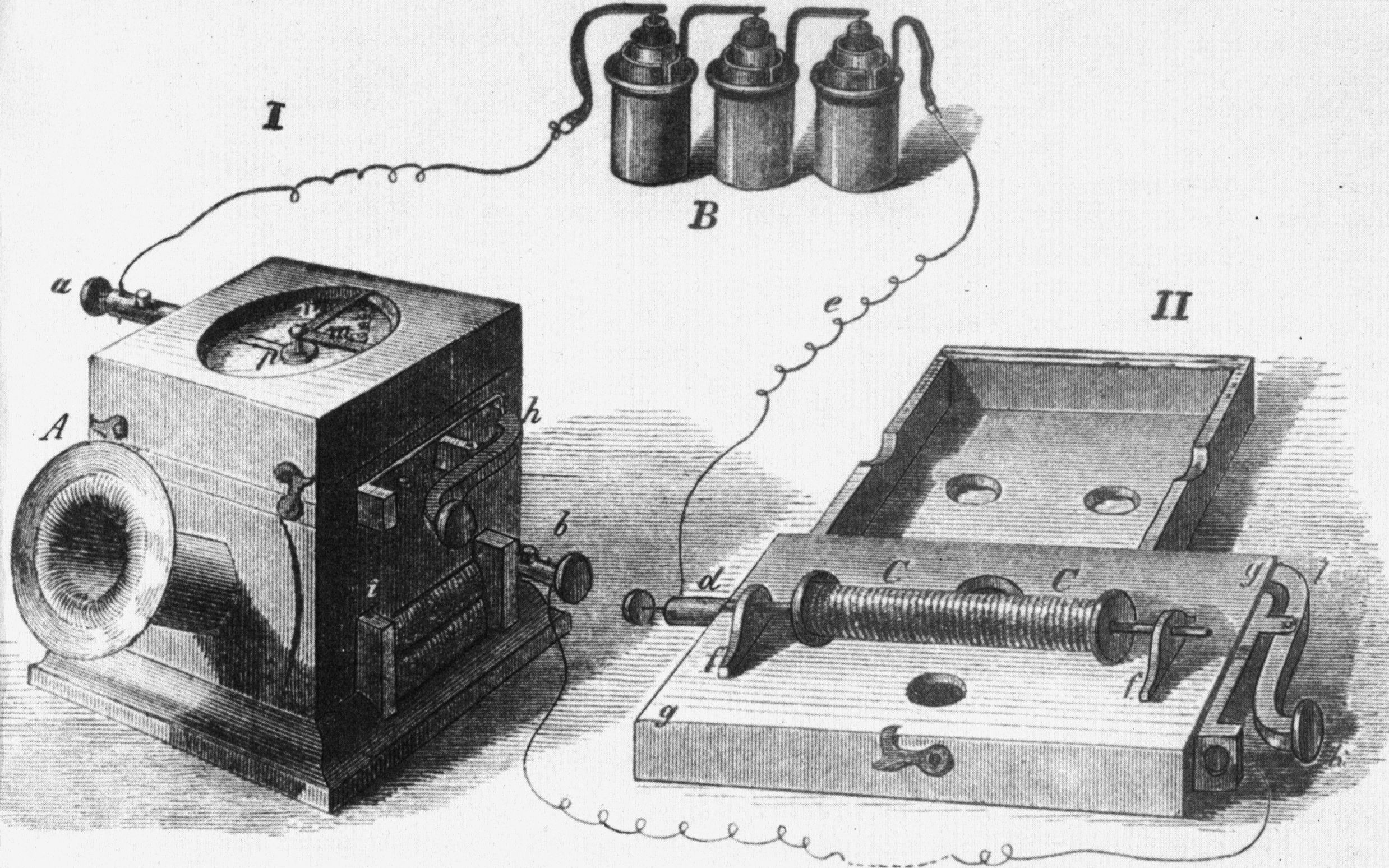
Reis's telephone, presented to the Physical Society of Frankfurt, Germany on 26 October 1861, first device called telephone

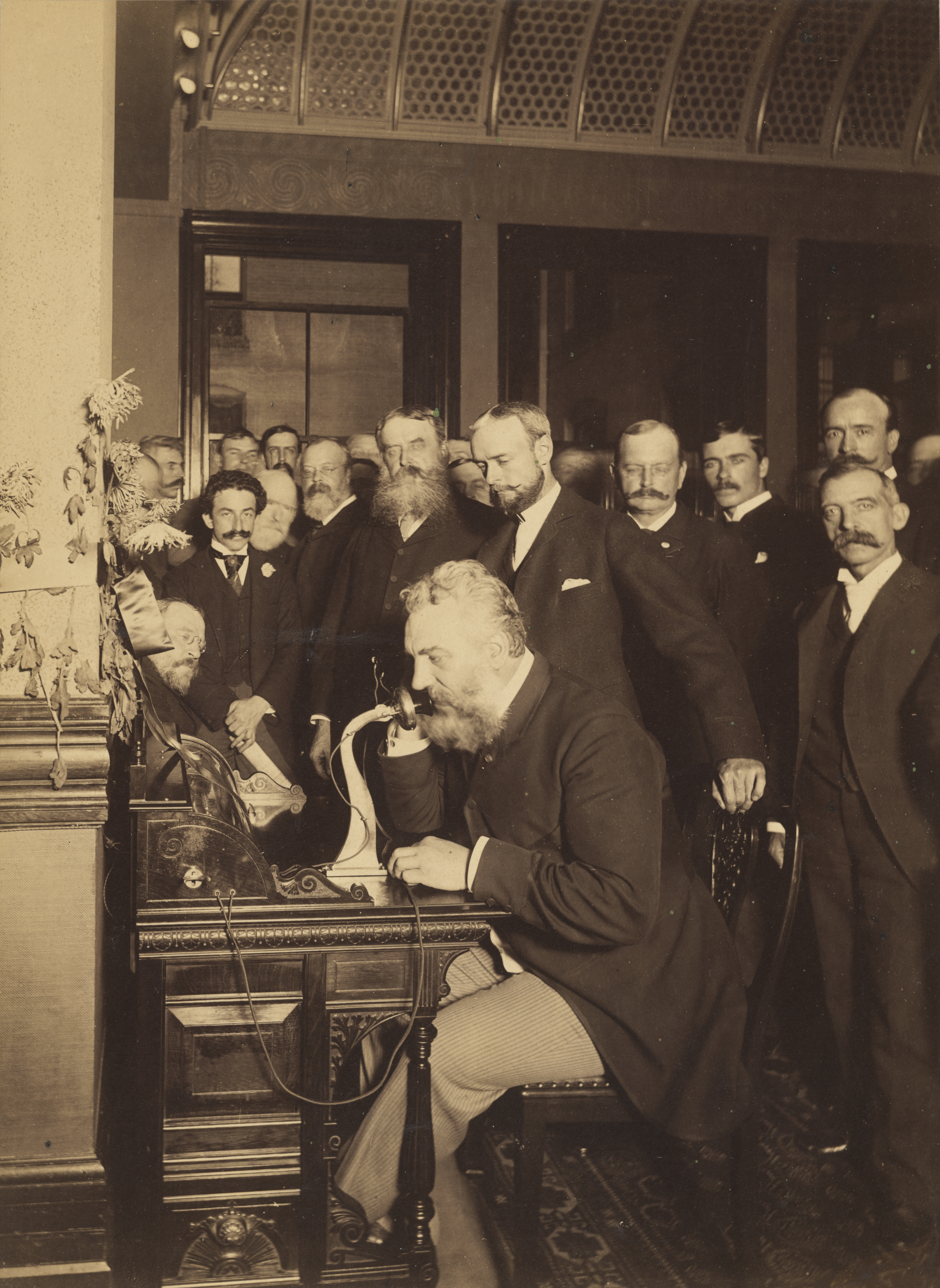
Bell placing the first New York to Chicago telephone call in 1892

Before the development of the electric telephone, the term telephone was applied to other inventions, and not all early researchers of the electrical device used the term. Perhaps the earliest use of the word for a communications system was the telephon created by Gottfried Huth in 1796. Huth proposed an alternative to the optical telegraph of Claude Chappe in which the operators in the signaling towers would shout to each other by means of what he called "speaking tubes", but would now be called giant megaphones. A communication device for sailing vessels, called telephone, was invented by Captain John Taylor in 1844. This instrument used four air horns to communicate with vessels in foggy weather.

Johann Philipp Reis used the term in reference to his invention, commonly known as the Reis telephone, in c. 1860. His device appears to be the first device based on the conversion of sound into electrical impulses.

The term telephone was adopted into the vocabulary of many languages. It is derived from the Greek: τῆλε, tēle, "far" and φωνή, phōnē, "voice", together meaning "distant voice".

Credit for the invention of the electric telephone is frequently disputed. As with other influential inventions such as radio, television, the light bulb, and the computer, several inventors pioneered experimental work on voice transmission over a wire and improved on each other's ideas. New controversies over the issue still arise from time to time. Charles Bourseul, Antonio Meucci, Johann Philipp Reis, Alexander Graham Bell, and Elisha Gray, amongst others, have all been credited with the invention of the telephone.

Alexander Graham Bell was the first to be awarded a patent for the electric telephone by the United States Patent and Trademark Office (USPTO) in March 1876. Before Bell's patent, the telephone transmitted sound in a way that was similar to the telegraph. This method used vibrations and circuits to send electrical pulses, but was missing key features. Bell found that this method produced a sound through intermittent currents, but in order for the telephone to work, a fluctuating current reproduced sounds the best. The fluctuating currents became the basis for the working telephone, creating Bell's patent. That first patent by Bell was the master patent of the telephone, from which other patents for electric telephone devices and features flowed.

In 1876, shortly after Bell's patent application, Hungarian engineer Tivadar Puskás proposed the telephone switch, which allowed for the formation of telephone exchanges, and eventually networks.

In the United Kingdom, the blower is used as a slang term for a telephone. The term came from navy slang for a speaking tube. In the U.S., a somewhat dated slang term refers to the telephone as "the horn," as in "I couldn't get him on the horn," or "I'll be off the horn in a moment."

=== Timeline of early development ===
- 1844: Innocenzo Manzetti first mooted the idea of a "speaking telegraph" or telephone. Use of the "speaking telegraph" and "sound telegraph" monikers would eventually be replaced by the newer, distinct name, "telephone".
- 1849: Antonio Meucci developed a voice-communication apparatus that several sources credit as the first telephone.
- 26 August 1854: Charles Bourseul published an article in the magazine L'Illustration (Paris): "Transmission électrique de la parole" (electric transmission of speech), describing a "make-and-break" type telephone transmitter later created by Johann Reis.
- 26 October 1861: Johann Philipp Reis (1834–1874) publicly demonstrated the Reis telephone before the Physical Society of Frankfurt. It was the first device to transmit a voice via electronic signals and for that the first modern telephone. Reis also coined the term. He used his telephone to transmit the phrase "Das Pferd frisst keinen Gurkensalat" ("The horse does not eat cucumber salad").
- 22 August 1865, La Feuille d'Aoste reported "It is rumored that English technicians to whom Manzetti illustrated his method for transmitting spoken words on the telegraph wire intend to apply said invention in England on several private telegraph lines". However, telephones would not be demonstrated there until 1876, with a set of telephones from Bell.
- 28 December 1871: Antonio Meucci files patent caveat No. 3335 in the U.S. Patent Office, titled "Sound Telegraph", describing communication of voice between two people by wire. A patent caveat was not an invention patent award, but only an unverified notice filed by an individual that he or she intends to file a patent application in the future.
- 1874: Meucci, after having renewed the caveat for two years does not renew it again, and the caveat lapses.
- 6 April 1875: Bell's U.S. Patent 161,739 "Transmitters and Receivers for Electric Telegraphs" is granted. This uses multiple vibrating steel reeds in make-break circuits.
- 11 February 1876: Elisha Gray invents a liquid transmitter for use with the telephone but does not build one.
- 14 February 1876: Gray files a patent caveat for transmitting the human voice through a telegraphic circuit.
- 14 February 1876: Alexander Graham Bell applies for the patent "Improvements in Telegraphy", for electromagnetic telephones using what is now called amplitude modulation (oscillating current and voltage) but which he referred to as "undulating current".
- 19 February 1876: Gray is notified by the U.S. Patent Office of an interference between his caveat and Bell's patent application. Gray decides to abandon his caveat.
- 7 March 1876: Bell's U.S. patent 174,465 "Improvement in Telegraphy" is granted, covering "the method of, and apparatus for, transmitting vocal or other sounds telegraphically…by causing electrical undulations, similar in form to the vibrations of the air accompanying the said vocal or other sound."
- 10 March 1876: The first successful telephone transmission of clear speech using a liquid transmitter when Bell spoke into his device, "Mr. Watson, come here, I want to see you." and Watson heard each word distinctly.
- 30 January 1877: Bell's U.S. patent 186,787 is granted for an electromagnetic telephone using permanent magnets, iron diaphragms, and a call bell.
- 27 April 1877: Thomas Edison files a patent application for a carbon (graphite) transmitter. It was published as No. 474,230 on 3 May 1892, after a 15-year delay because of litigation. Edison was granted patent 222,390 for a carbon granules transmitter in 1879.
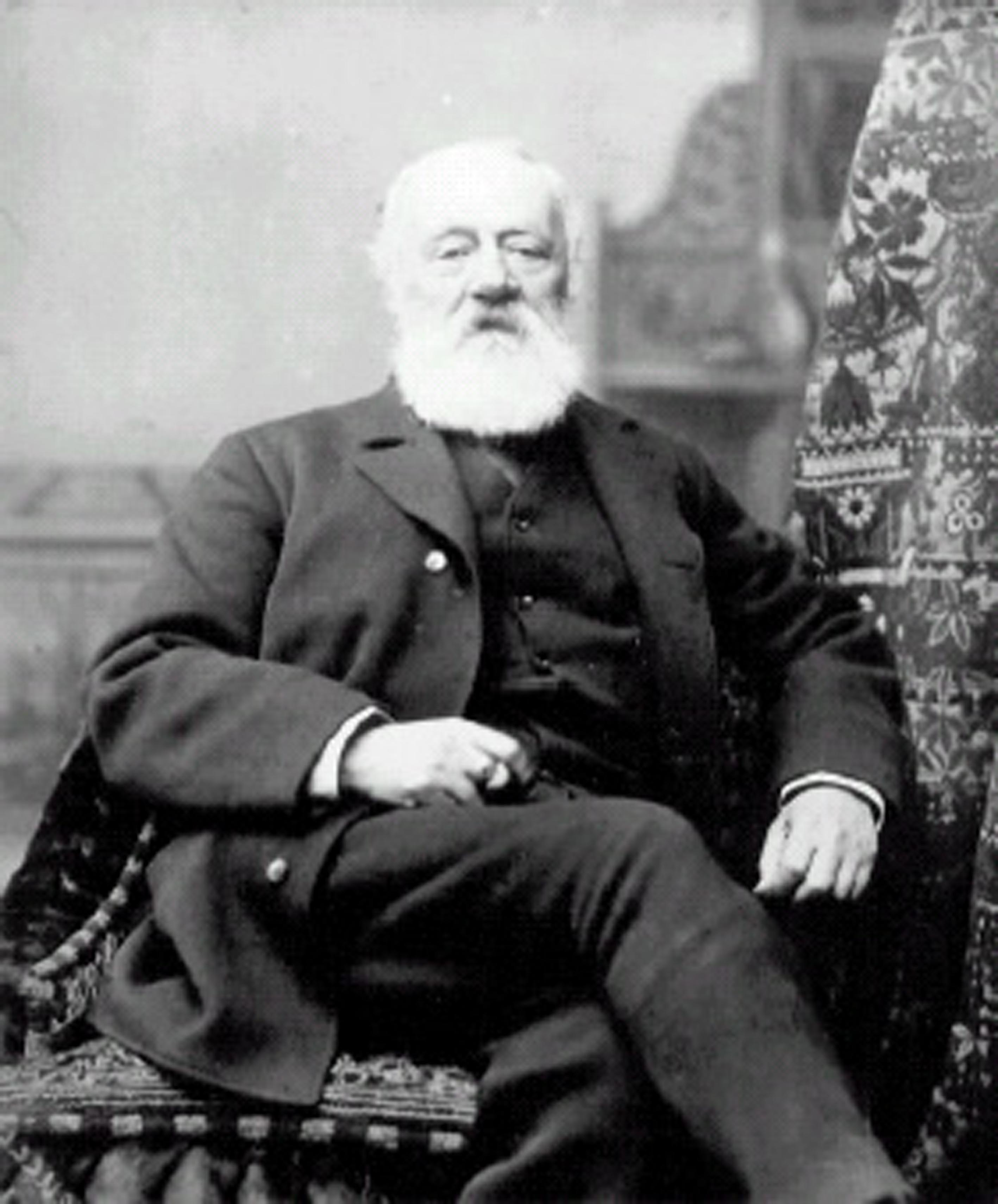
Antonio Meucci, 1849, developed a voice-communication apparatus that several sources credit as the first telephone.

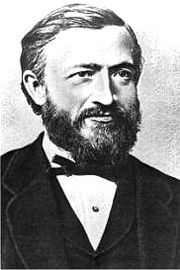
Johann Philipp Reis constructed the first device to transmit a voice via electronic signals and for that the first modern telephone.

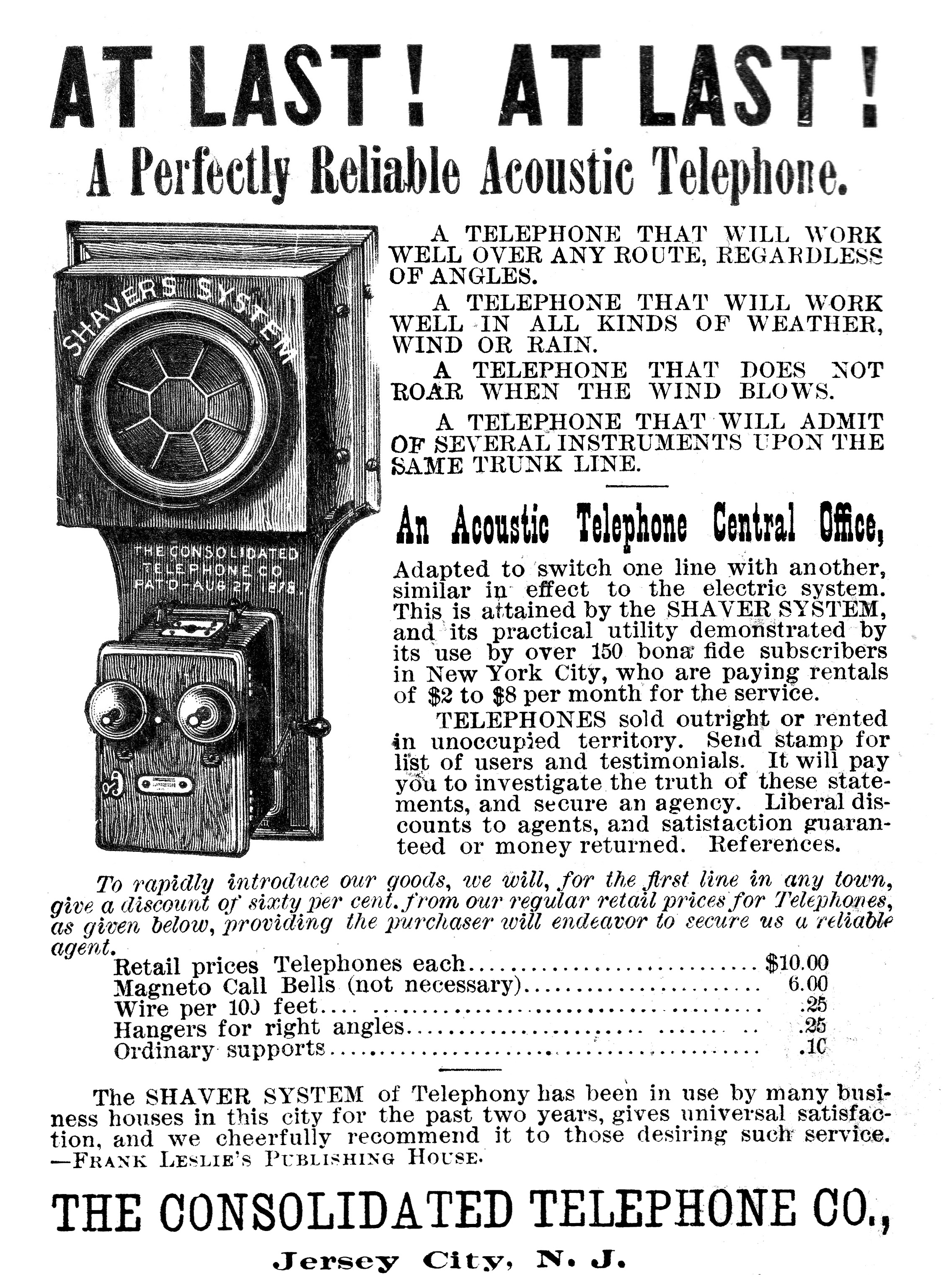
Acoustic telephone ad, The Consolidated Telephone Co., Jersey City, New Jersey, 1886

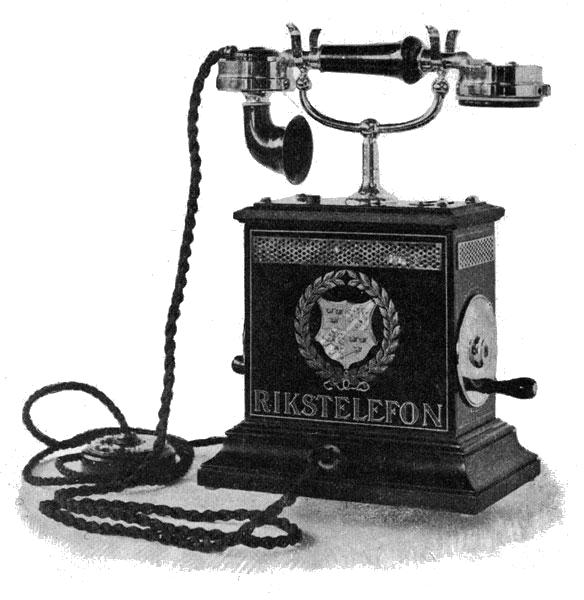
1896 telephone from Sweden

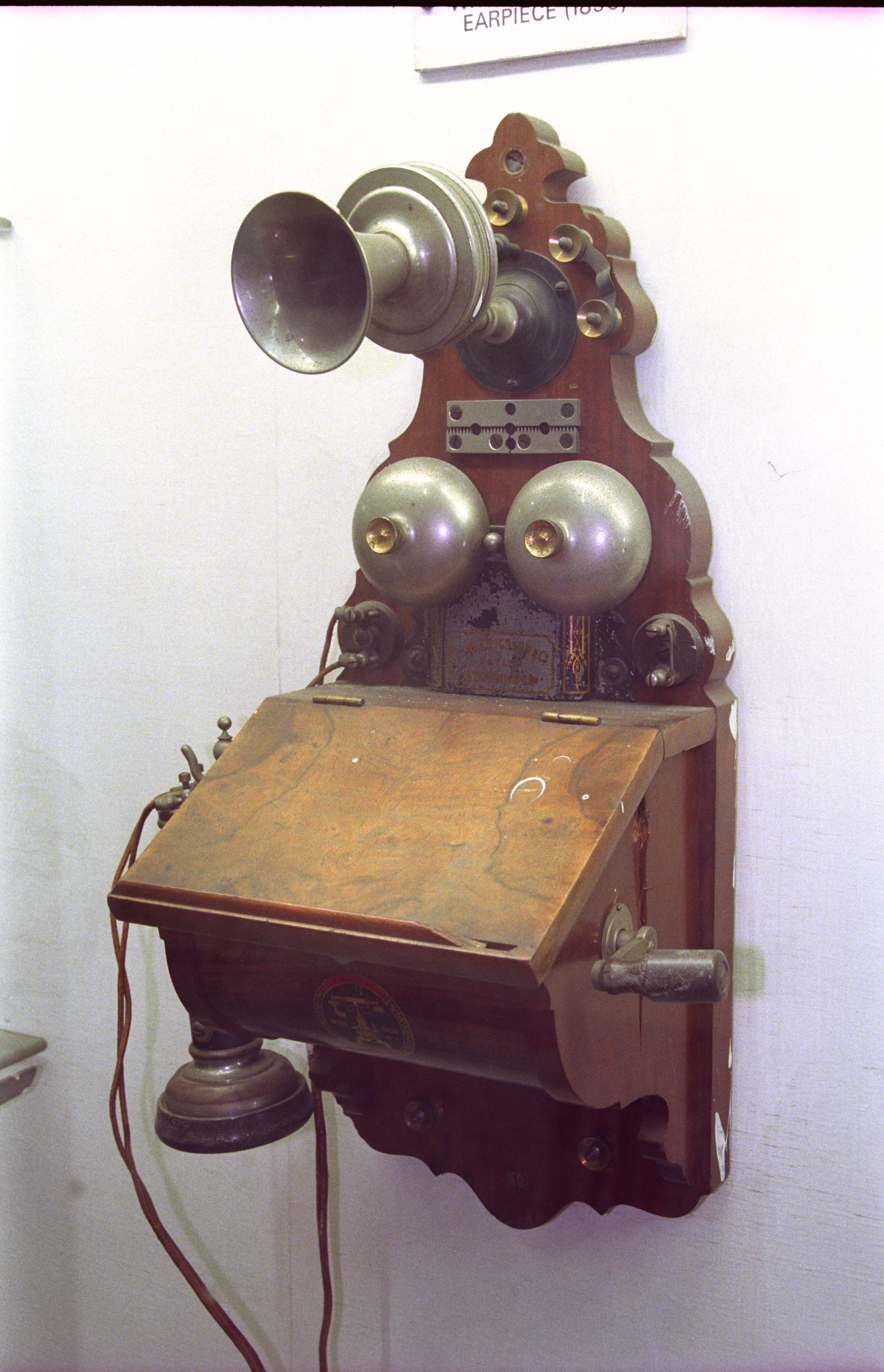
Wooden wall telephone with a hand-cranked magneto generator

== Early commercial instruments ==
Early telephones were technically diverse. Some used a water microphone, some had a metal diaphragm that induced current in an electromagnet wound around a permanent magnet, and some were dynamic – their diaphragm vibrated a coil of wire in the field of a permanent magnet or the coil vibrated the diaphragm. The sound-powered dynamic variants survived in small numbers through the 20th century in military and maritime applications, where its ability to create its own electrical power was crucial. Most, however, used the Edison/Berliner carbon transmitter, which was much louder than the other kinds, even though it required an induction coil which was an impedance matching transformer to make it compatible with the impedance of the line. The Edison patents kept the Bell monopoly viable into the 20th century, by which time the network was more important than the instrument.

Early telephones were locally powered, using either a dynamic transmitter or by the powering of a transmitter with a local battery. One of the jobs of outside plant personnel was to visit each telephone periodically to inspect the battery. During the 20th century, telephones powered from the telephone exchange over the same wires that carried the voice signals became common.

Early telephones used a single wire for the subscriber's line, with ground return used to complete the circuit (as used in telegraphs). The earliest dynamic telephones also had only one port opening for sound, with the user alternately listening and speaking (or rather, shouting) into the same hole. Sometimes the instruments were operated in pairs at each end, making conversation more convenient but also more expensive.

At first, the benefits of a telephone exchange were not exploited. Instead, telephones were leased in pairs to a subscriber, who had to arrange for a telegraph contractor to construct a line between them, for example, between a home and a shop. Users who wanted the ability to speak to several different locations would need to obtain and set up three or four pairs of telephones. Western Union, already using telegraph exchanges, quickly extended the principle to its telephones in New York City and San Francisco, and Bell was not slow in appreciating the potential.

Signalling began in an appropriately primitive manner. The user alerted the other end, or the exchange operator, by whistling into the transmitter. Exchange operation soon resulted in telephones being equipped with a bell in a ringer box, first operated over a second wire, and later over the same wire, but with a condenser (capacitor) in series with the bell coil to allow the AC ringer signal through while still blocking DC (keeping the phone "on hook"). Telephones connected to the earliest Strowger switch automatic exchanges had seven wires, one for the knife switch, one for each telegraph key, one for the bell, one for the push-button and two for speaking. Large wall telephones in the early 20th century usually incorporated the bell, and separate bell boxes for desk phones dwindled away in the middle of the century.

Rural and other telephones that were not on a common battery exchange had a magneto hand-cranked generator to produce a high voltage alternating signal to ring the bells of other telephones on the line and to alert the operator. Some local farming communities that were not connected to the main networks set up barbed wire telephone lines that exploited the existing system of field fences to transmit the signal.

In the 1890s a new smaller style of telephone was introduced, packaged in three parts. The transmitter stood on a stand, known as a "candlestick" for its shape. When not in use, the receiver hung on a hook with a switch in it, known as a "switchhook". Previous telephones required the user to operate a separate switch to connect either the voice or the bell. With the new kind, the user was less likely to leave the phone "off the hook". In phones connected to magneto exchanges, the bell, induction coil, battery and magneto were in a separate bell box or "ringer box". In phones connected to common battery exchanges, the ringer box was installed under a desk, or other out-of-the-way place, since it did not need a battery or magneto.

Cradle designs were also used at this time, having a handle with the receiver and transmitter attached, now called a handset, separate from the cradle base that housed the magneto crank and other parts. They were larger than the "candlestick" and more popular.

Disadvantages of single-wire operation such as crosstalk and hum from nearby AC power wires had already led to the use of twisted pairs and, for long-distance telephones, four-wire circuits. Users at the beginning of the 20th century did not place long-distance calls from their own telephones but made an appointment and were connected with the assistance of a telephone operator.

What turned out to be the most popular and longest-lasting physical style of telephone was introduced in the early 20th century, including Bell's 202-type desk set. A carbon granule transmitter and electromagnetic receiver were united in a single molded plastic handle, which when not in use was secured in a cradle in the base unit. The circuit diagram of the model 202 shows the direct connection of the transmitter to the line, while the receiver was inductively coupled. In local battery configurations, when the local loop was too long to provide sufficient current from the exchange, the transmitter was powered by a local battery and inductively coupled, while the receiver was included in the local loop. The coupling transformer and the ringer were mounted in a separate enclosure, called the subscriber set. The dial switch in the base interrupted the line current by repeatedly but very briefly disconnecting the line one to ten times for each digit, and the hook switch (in the center of the circuit diagram) disconnected the line and the transmitter battery while the handset was on the cradle.

In the 1930s, telephone sets were developed that combined the bell and induction coil with the desk set, obviating a separate ringer box. The rotary dial becoming commonplace in the 1930s in many areas enabled customer-dialed service, but some magneto systems remained even into the 1960s. The village of Bryant Pond, Maine is believed to be the last telephone exchange in the U.S. to convert from magneto to direct-dial service on October 11, 1983. After World War II, the telephone networks saw rapid expansion and more efficient telephone sets, such as the model 500 telephone in the United States, were developed that permitted larger local networks centered around central offices. A breakthrough new technology was the introduction of Touch-Tone signaling using push-button telephones by American Telephone & Telegraph Company (AT&T) in 1963.

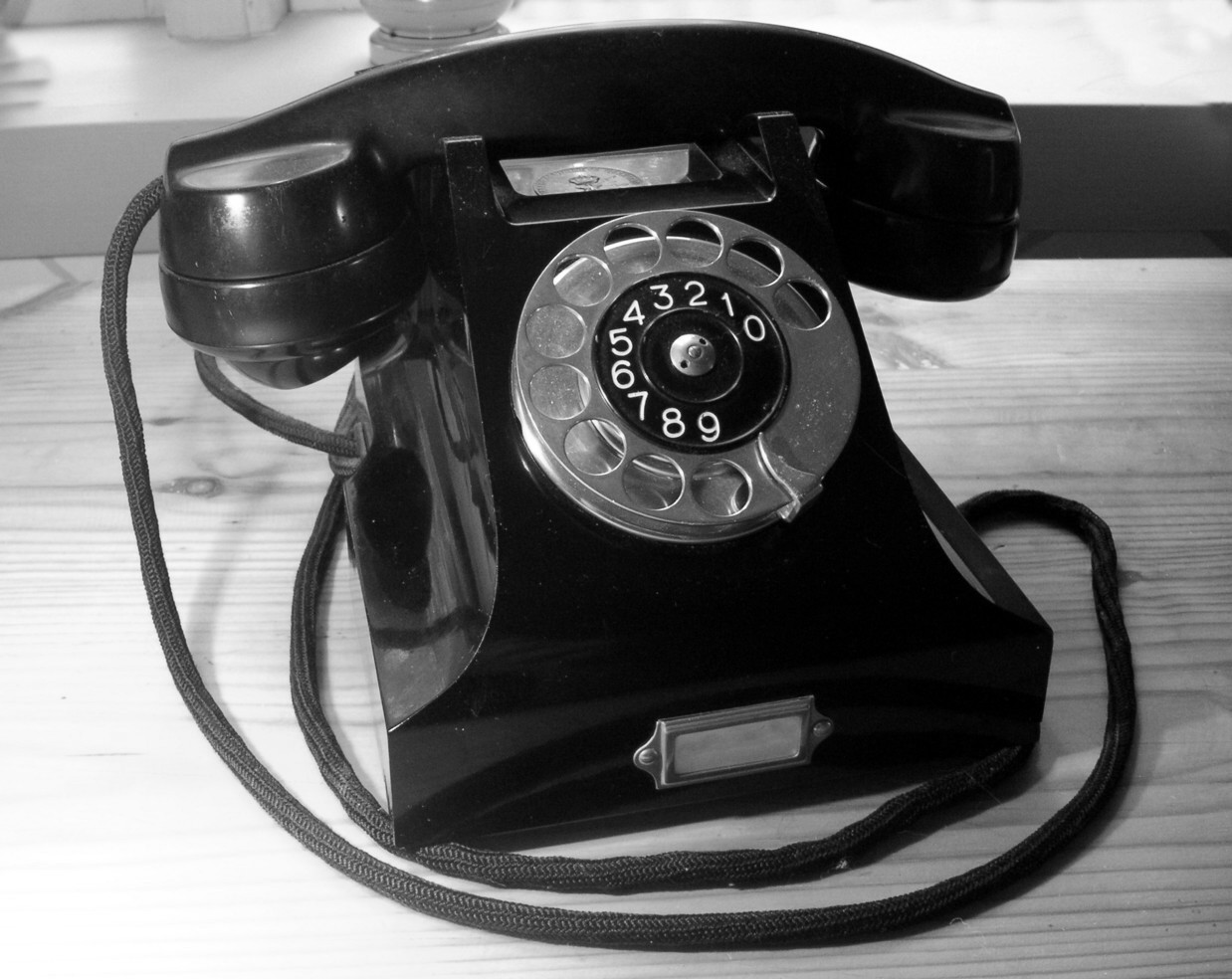
Ericsson DBH 1001 (c. 1931), the first combined telephone made with a Bakelite housing and handset.

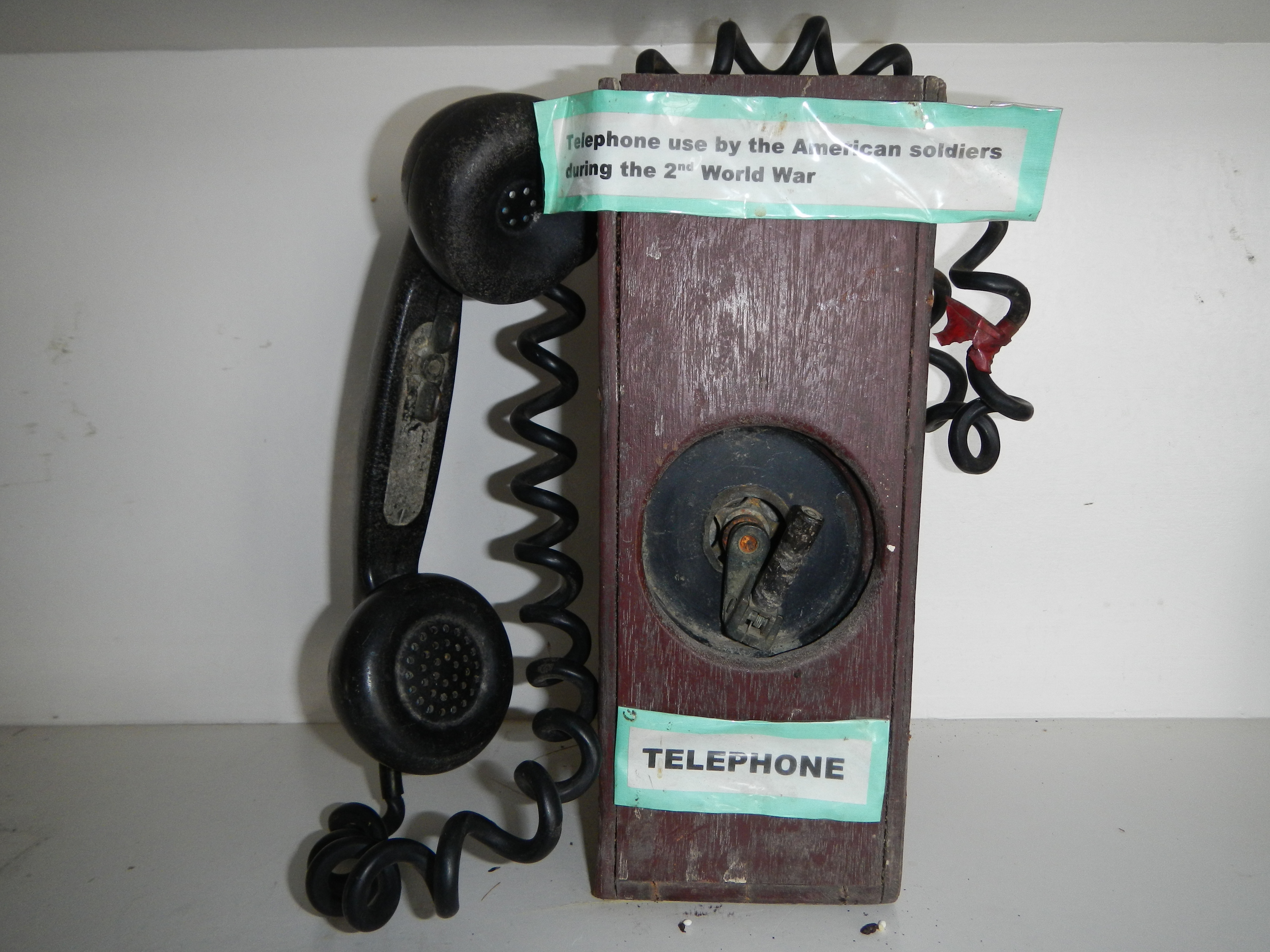
Telephone used by American soldiers (WWII, Minalin, Pampanga, Philippines)

Video shows the operation of an Ericofon

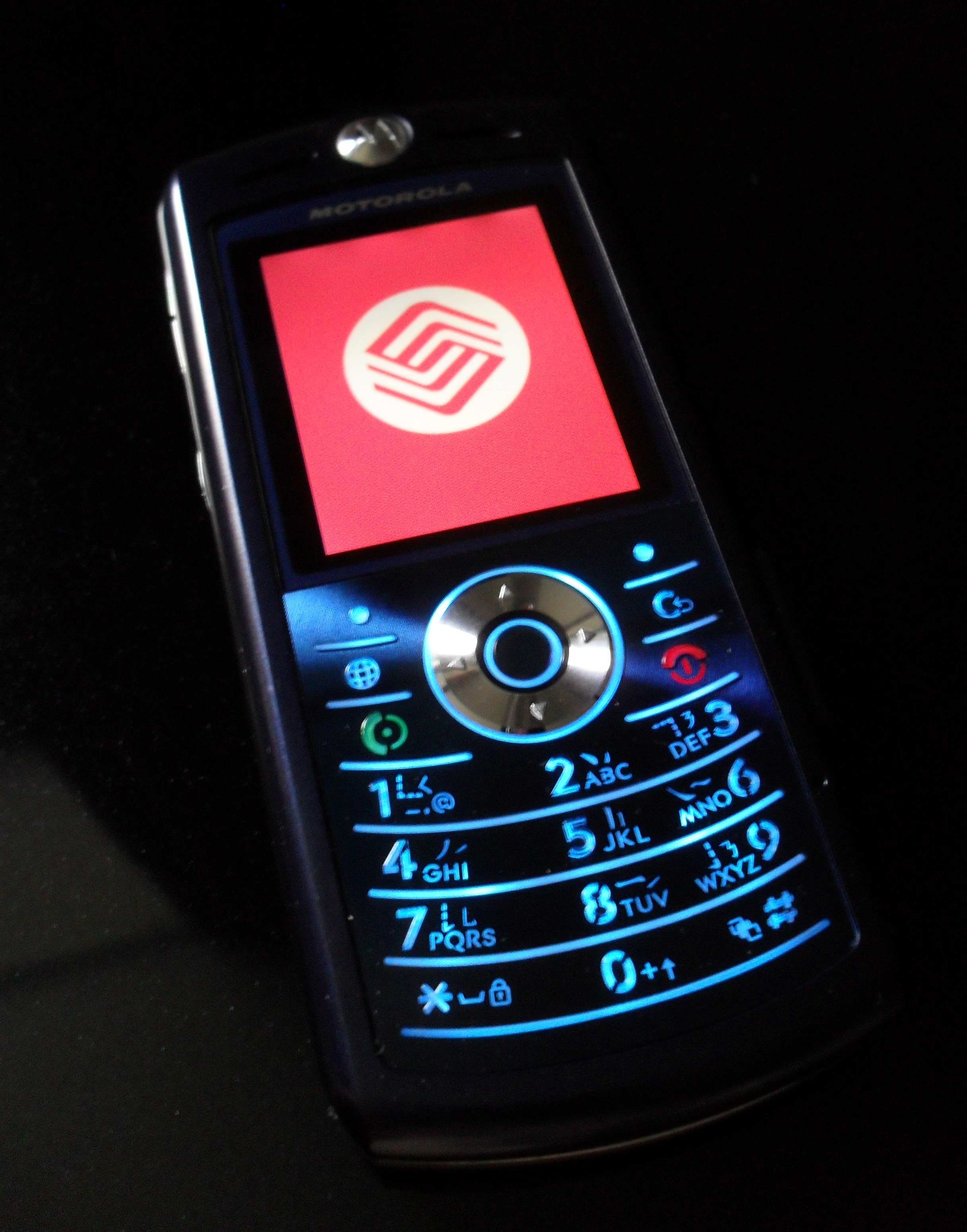
One type of mobile phone, called a cell phone

== Sound-powered telephones ==
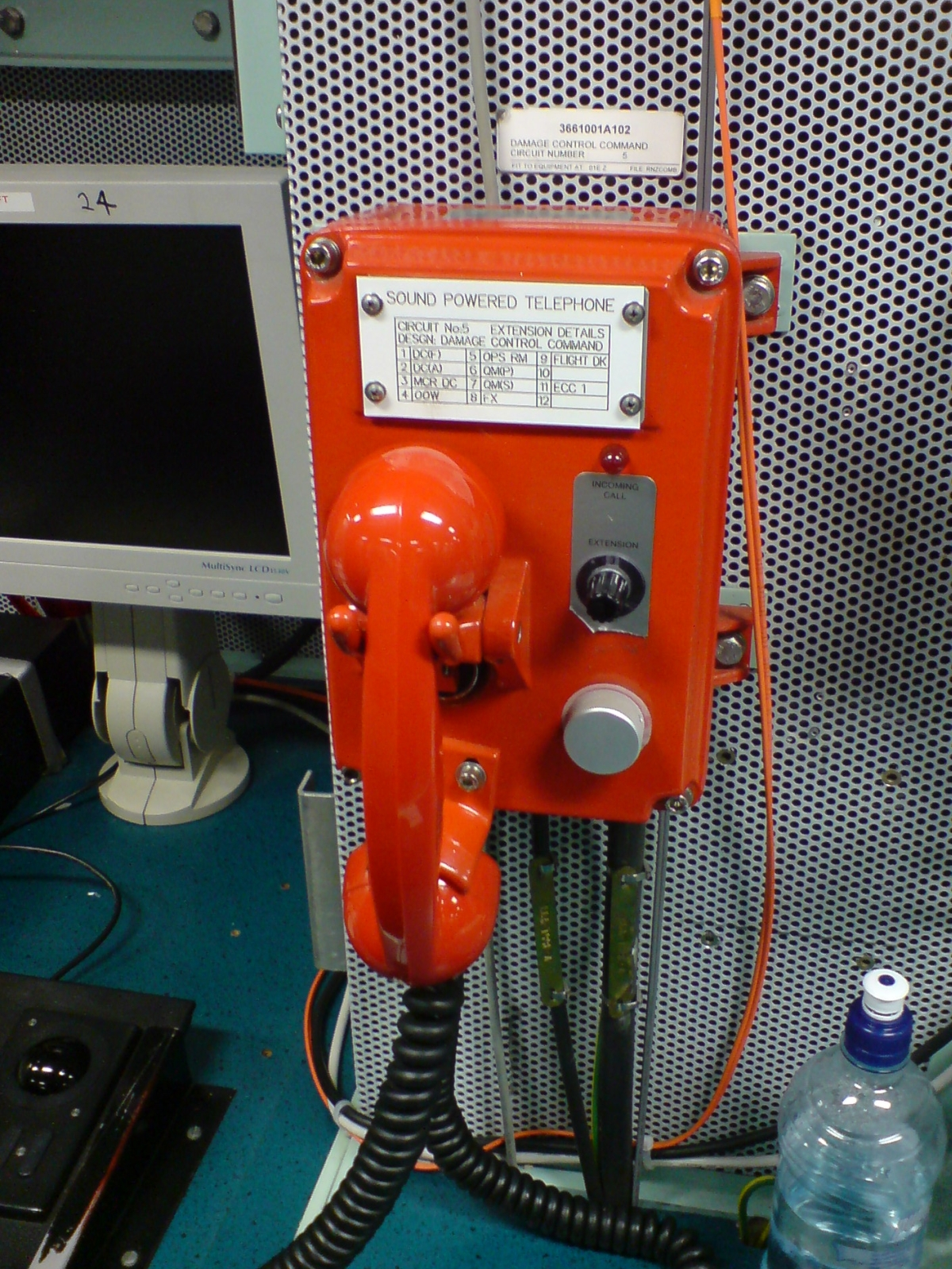
Modern emergency telephone powered by sound alone

A sound-powered telephone is a telephone which transmits voice communication by wire, powered by the energy of the sound waves of the operator speaking.

=== Principle of operation ===
A moving-coil microphone converts the sound waves into an electrical signal, which is then converted back into sound waves at the receiver's end. Similar to early regular landline telephones, operators of sound-powered telephones generally alert the receiver of a call using a hand-cranked generator (magneto), which generates an electrical current which activates a buzzer at the receiver's end, sometimes known as a howler or growler. Some telephone systems can use external electrical power to operate ringers or amplifiers, but will revert to sound-powered communications in the event of failure of the external power supply. Stations are usually connected via twisted pair wires to reduce electrical interference, and can be positioned at considerable distances from each other in the order of several kilometers. Using 1mm core diameter twisted-pair wiring, some sound-powered telephone systems can operate a pair of handsets positioned up to 48 km (30 miles) apart.

=== Applications ===
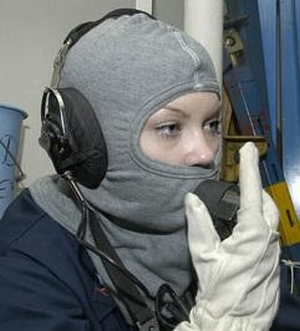
A U.S. Navy petty officer uses a sound-powered telephone during a general quarters drill.

Because sound-powered telephones do not require external electrical power, they are used where reliable communications are vital even in event of loss of power. They are often used for communications in airports, railways and public utilities, mining, ski slopes, bridges, sporting arenas and shipyards. Because they operate at low voltages, they are suitable for use in situations where there is a risk of explosions or fire, such as chemical plants, oil and gas works, arsenals, mines and quarries. They are frequently used aboard ships, especially naval vessels, and in land military communications.

Aboard naval vessels, sound-powered telephones generally have auxiliary wiring circuits routed through the ship, to reduce the likelihood that all circuits will be rendered inoperable by battle damage.

== Digital telephones and voice over IP ==
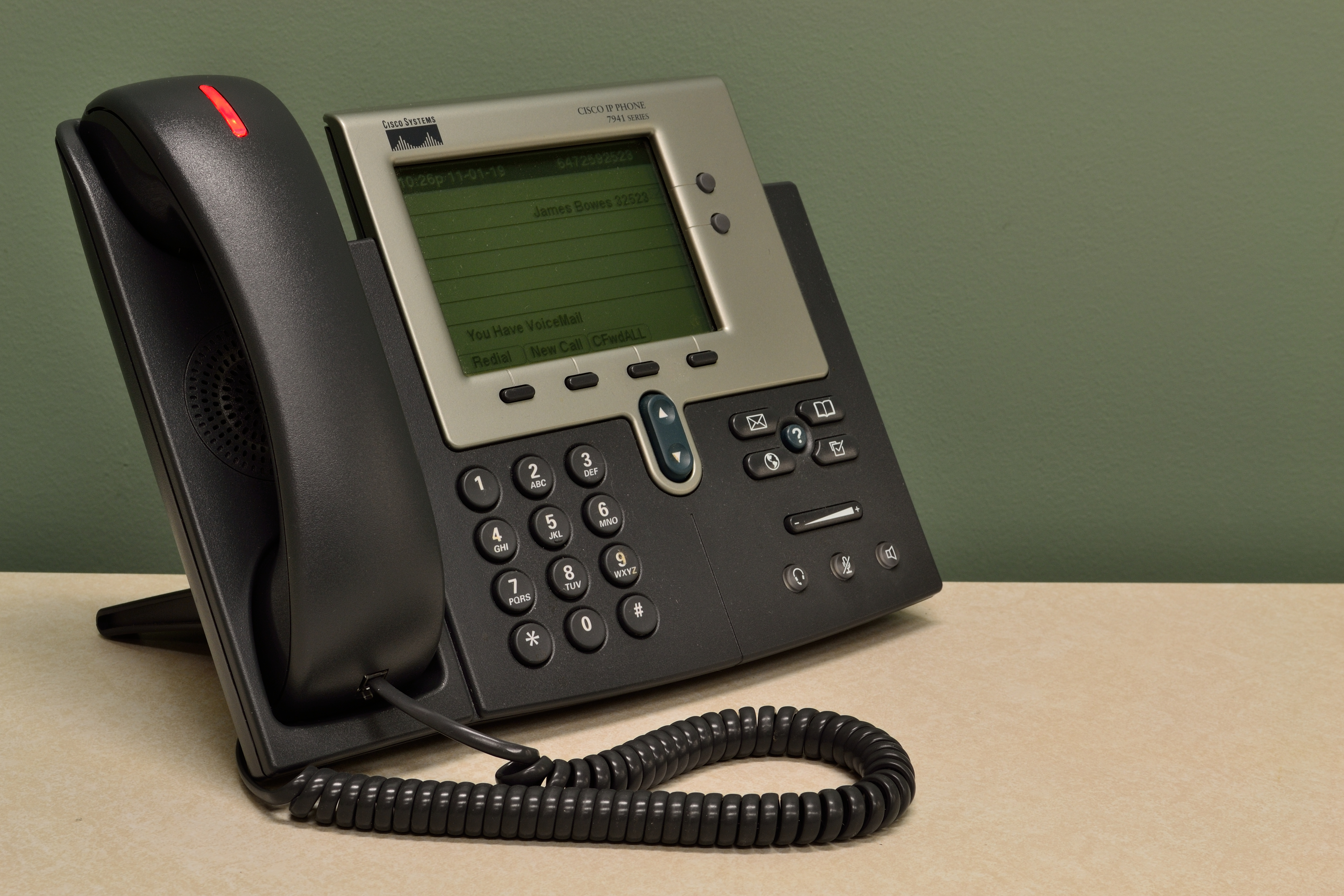
An IP desktop telephone attached to a computer network

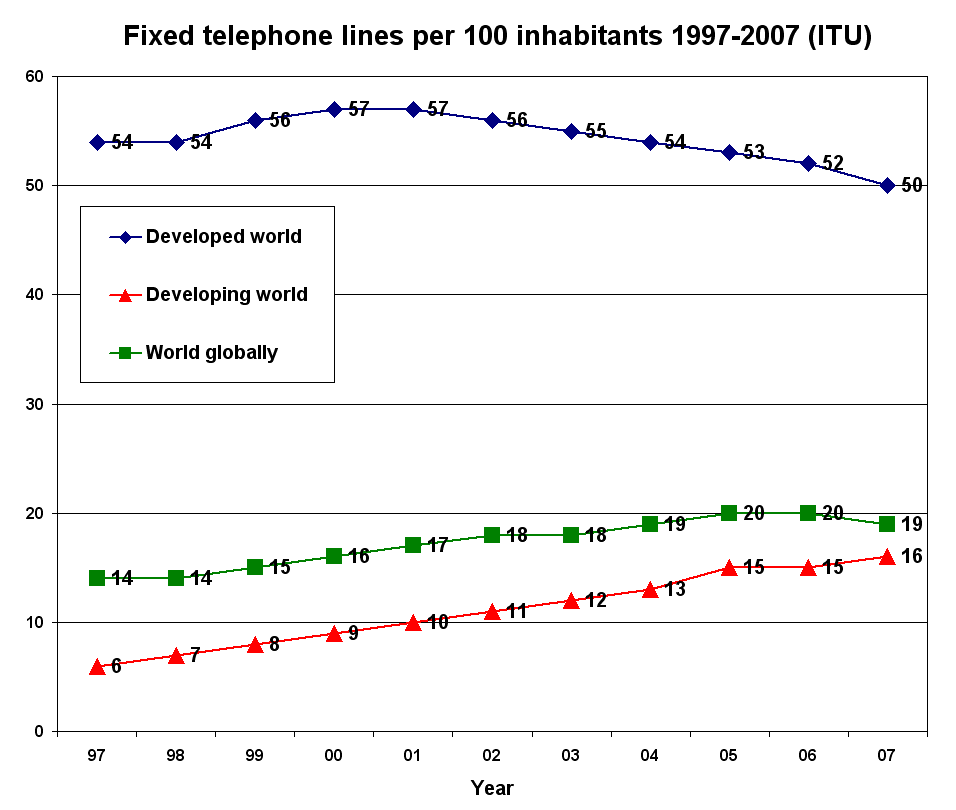
Fixed telephone lines per 100 inhabitants 1997–2007

The invention of the transistor in 1947 dramatically changed the technology used in telephone systems and in the long-distance transmission networks over the next several decades. With the development of stored program control and MOS integrated circuits for electronic switching systems, and new transmission technologies such as pulse-code modulation (PCM), telephony gradually evolved towards digital telephony, which improved the capacity, quality, and cost of the network.

Integrated Services Digital Network (ISDN) was launched in the 1980's, providing businesses and consumers with access to digital telephony services such as data, voice, video, and fax services.

The development of digital data communications methods made it possible to digitize voice and transmit it as real-time data across computer networks and the Internet, giving rise to the field of Internet Protocol (IP) telephony, also known as voice over Internet Protocol (VoIP). VoIP has proven to be a disruptive technology that is rapidly replacing traditional telephone network infrastructure.

By January 2005, up to 10% of telephone subscribers in Japan and South Korea had switched to this digital telephone service. A January 2005 Newsweek article suggested that Internet telephony may be "the next big thing." The technology has spawned a new industry comprising many VoIP companies that offer services to consumers and businesses. The reported global VoIP market in October 2021 was $85.2 billion with a projection of $102.5 billion by 2026.

IP telephony uses high-bandwidth Internet connections and specialized customer premises equipment to transmit telephone calls via the Internet, or any modern private data network. The customer equipment may be an analog telephone adapter (ATA) which translates the signals of a conventional analog telephone; an IP Phone, a dedicated standalone device; or a computer softphone application, utilizing the microphone and headset devices of a personal computer or smartphone.

In recent years, VoIP technology has evolved to integrate with mobile networks, including Voice over LTE (VoLTE) and Voice over 5G (Vo5G), enabling seamless voice communication over mobile data networks. These advancements have made VoIP not only a primary method for Internet-based communication but also a central feature of modern mobile communication infrastructure.

While traditional analog telephones are typically powered from the central office through the telephone line, digital telephones require a local power supply. Internet-based digital service also requires special provisions to provide the service location to the emergency services when an emergency telephone number is called.

== Cordless telephones ==
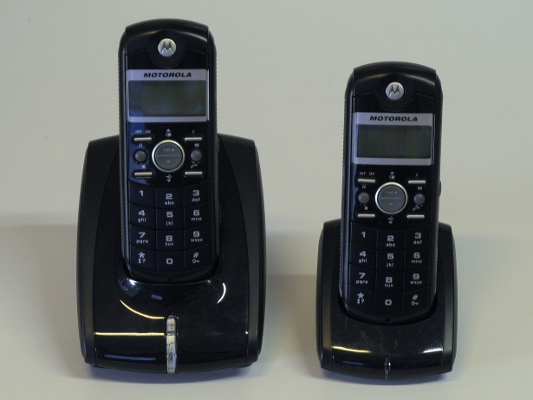
A cordless telephone system consisting of a handset resting on a base station (left) and a second handset resting on a battery charger unit (right)

A cordless telephone or portable telephone consists of a base station unit and one or more portable cordless handsets. The base station connects to a telephone line, or provides service by voice over IP (VOIP). The handset communicates with the base station via radio frequency signals. A handset's operational range is limited, usually to within the same building or within a short distance from the base station.

=== Base station ===
Base stations include a radio transceiver which enables full-duplex, outgoing and incoming signals and speech with the handsets. The base station often includes a microphone, audio amplifier, and a loudspeaker to enable hands-free speakerphone conversations, without needing to use a handset. The base station may also have a numeric keypad for dialing, and a display for caller ID. In addition, answering machine function may be built in.

The cordless handset contains a rechargeable battery, which the base station recharges when the handset rests in its cradle. Muilt-handset systems generally also have additional charging stands. A cordless telephone typically requires a constant electricity supply to power the base station and charger units by means of a DC transformer which plugs into a wall AC power outlet.

== Mobile phones ==
A mobile phone or cellphone or hand phone is a handheld telephone which connects via radio transmissions to a cellular telephone network. The cellular network consists of a network of ground based transmitter/receiver stations with antennas – which are usually located on towers or on buildings – and infrastructure connecting to the global telecommunications network. Analog cellular networks first appeared in 1979, followed by the introduction of digital cellular networks in the early 1990s, marking the beginning of the GSM standard. Over time, these networks evolved, with each new generation (2G, 3G, 4G, and beyond) offering improved data transmission capabilities and more advanced features for mobile communication.

Mobile phones require a SIM card to be inserted into the phone. The SIM card is a small PVC card containing a small integrated circuit which stores the user's international mobile subscriber identity (IMSI) number and its related key, which are used to identify and authenticate subscribers to the cellular network.

Mobile phones generally incorporate an LCD or OLED display, with some types, such as smartphones, having touch screens. Since the 1990s, mobile phones have gained other features which are not directly related to their primary function as telephones. These include text messaging, calendars, alarm clocks, personal schedulers, cameras, music players, games and later, internet access and smartphone functionality. Nearly all mobile phones have the ability to send text messages to other users via the SMS (Short Message Service) protocol. The multimedia messaging service (MMS) protocol enables users to send and receive multimedia content, such as photos, audio files and video files. As their functionality has increased over the years, many types of mobile phone, notably smartphones, require an operating system to run. Popular mobile phone operating systems in the past have included Symbian, Palm OS, BlackBerry OS and mobile phone versions of Windows. As of 2022, the most used operating systems are Google's Android and Apple's iOS.

Before the era of smartphones, mobile phones were generally manufactured by companies specializing in telecommunications equipment, such as Nokia, Motorola, and Ericsson. Since the advent of smartphones, mobile phone manufacturers have also included consumer electronics companies, such as Apple, Samsung and Xiaomi.

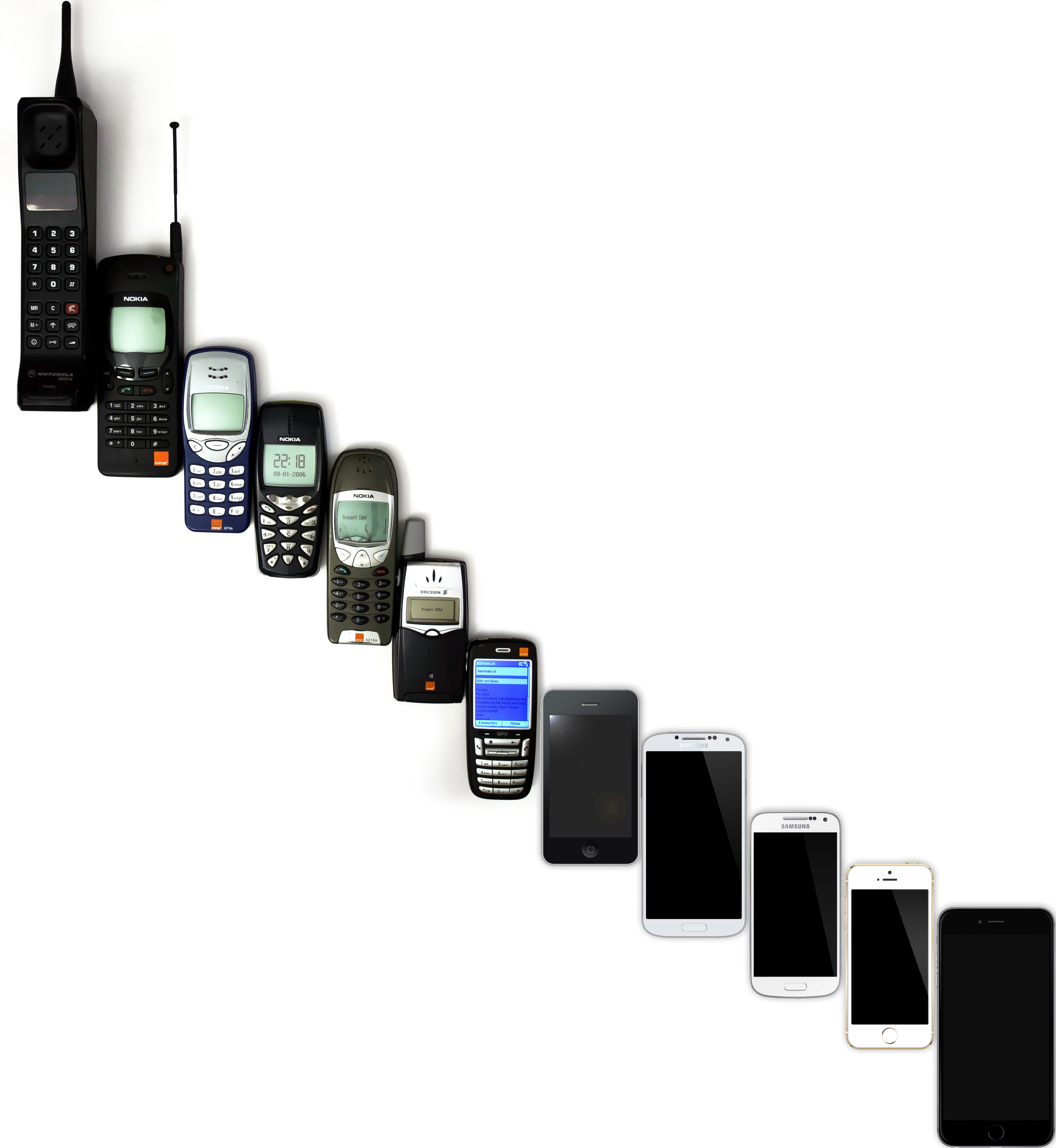
Two decades of evolution of mobile phones, from a 1992 Motorola 8900X-2 to the 2014 iPhone 6 Plus

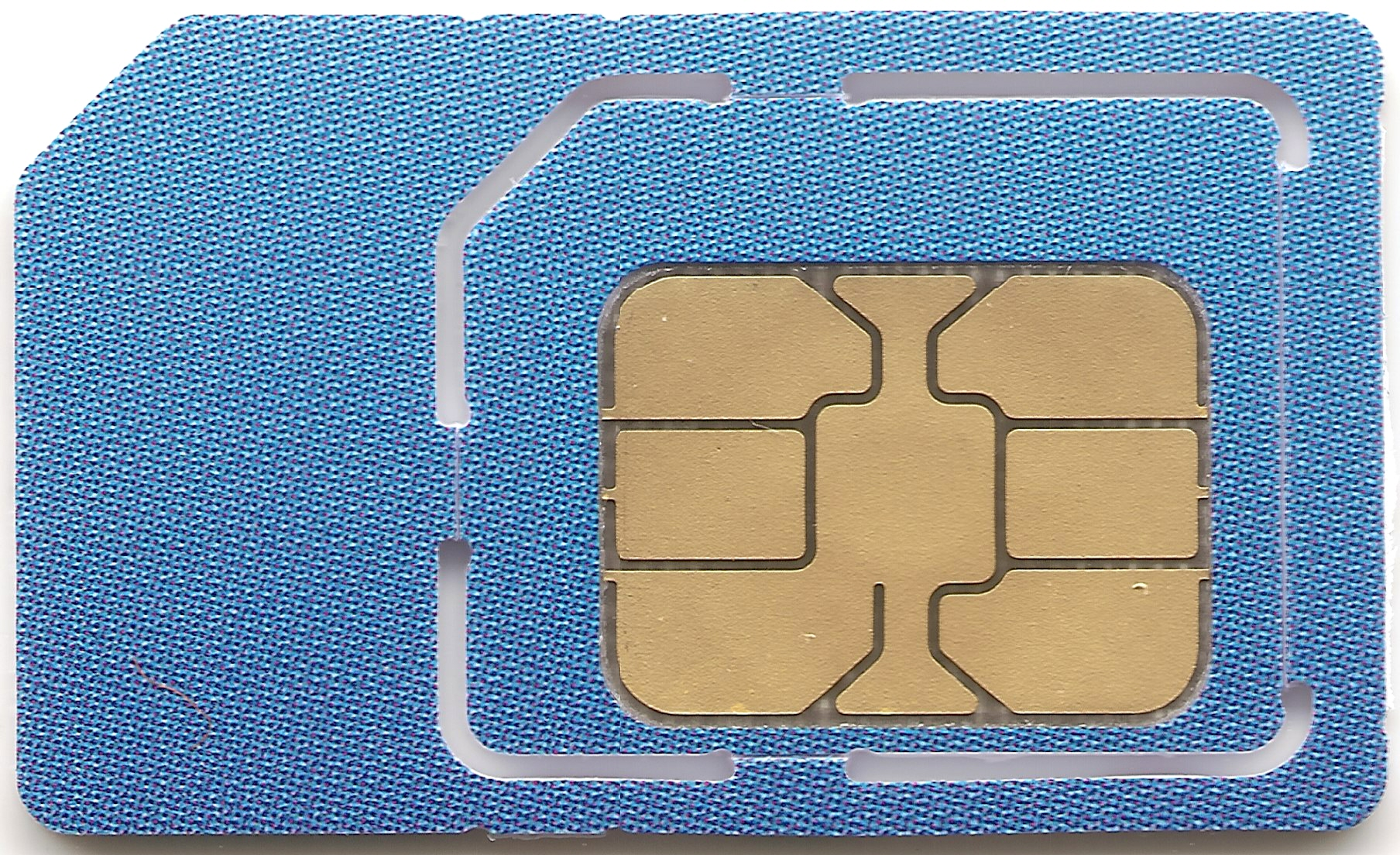
A typical SIM card (mini-SIM with a cutout to convert the card to micro-SIM size)

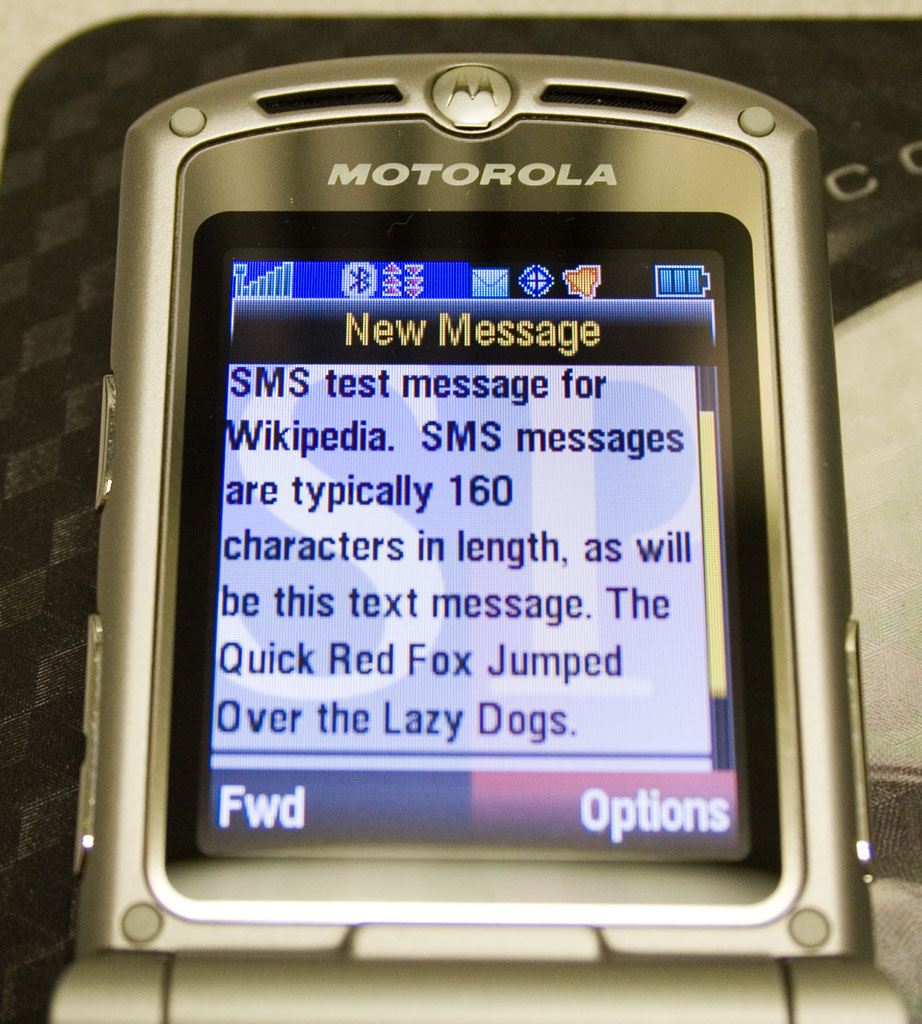
An SMS message written on a Motorola RAZR V3

=== Smartphones ===
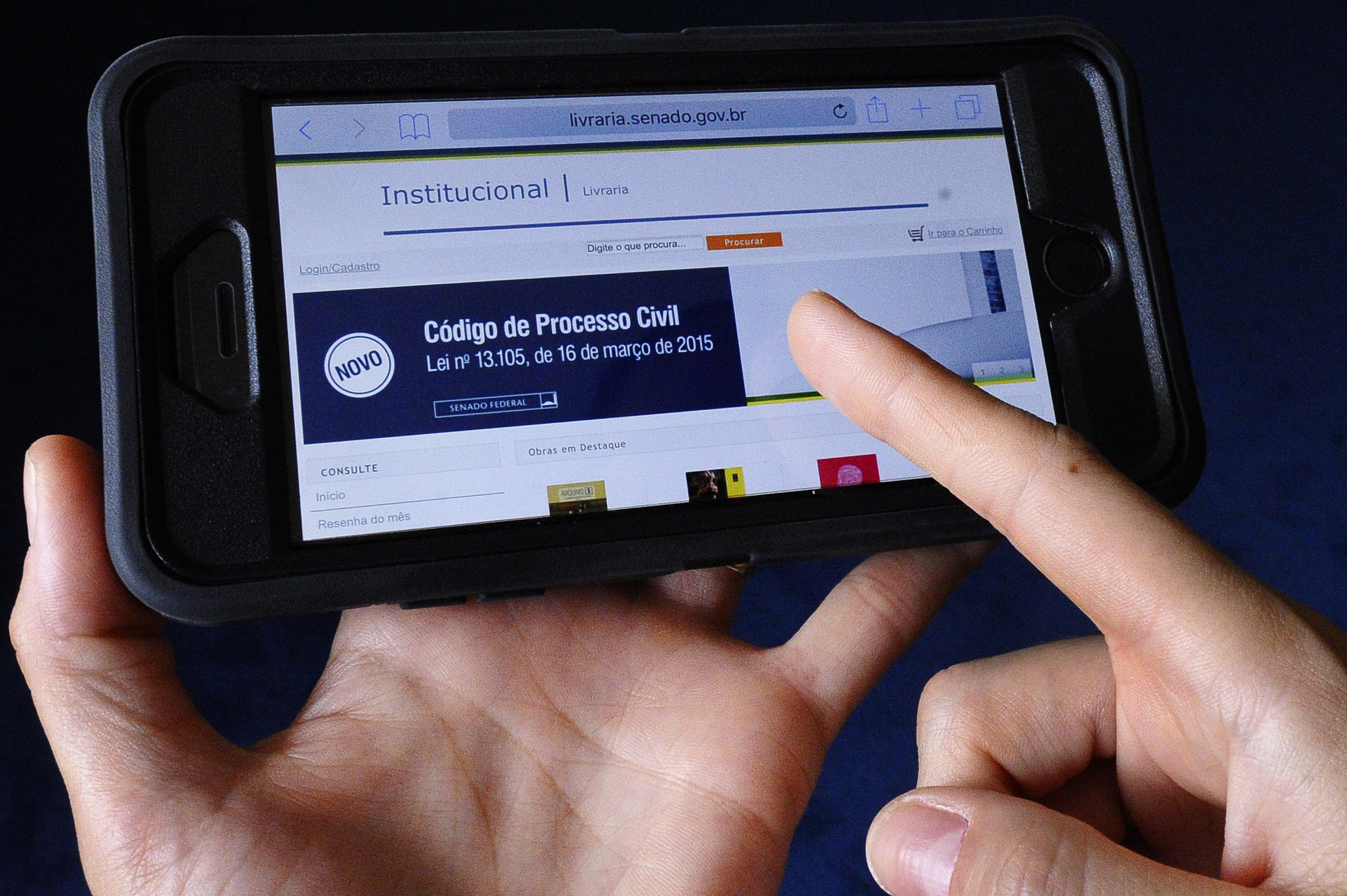
A smartphone with a touchscreen user interface, held in landscape orientation

As of 2022, most mobile phones are smartphones, being a combination of a mobile phone and a personal computing device in the same unit. Most smartphones are primarily operated using a graphical user interface and a touch screen. Many phones have a secondary voice user interface, such as Siri on Apple iPhones, which can operate many of the device's functions, as well as enabling users to use spoken commands to interact with the internet. Typically alphanumeric text input is accomplished via an on-screen virtual keyboard, although some smartphones have a small physical keyboard. Smartphones offer the ability to access internet data through the cellular network and via wi-fi, and usually allow direct connectivity to other devices via Bluetooth or a wired interface, such as USB or Lightning connectors.

Smartphones, being able to run apps, have vastly expanded functionality compared to previous mobile phones. Having internet access and built in cameras, smartphones have made video calling readily accessible via IP connections. Smartphones also have access to a large number of web services and web apps, giving them functionality similar to traditional computers, although smartphones are often limited by their relatively small screen size and the size of their keyboards. Typically, smartphones feature such tools as cameras, media players, web browsers, email clients, interactive maps, satellite navigation and a variety of sensors, such as a compass, accelerometers and GPS receivers. In addition to voice calls, smartphone users commonly communicate using a wide variety of messaging formats, including SMS, MMS, email, and various proprietary messaging services, such as iMessage and various social media platforms.

=== Mobile phone usage ===
In 2002, only 10% of the world's population used mobile phones and by 2005 that percentage had risen to 46%. By the end of 2009, there were a total of nearly 6 billion mobile and fixed-line telephone subscribers worldwide. This included 1.26 billion fixed-line subscribers and 4.6 billion mobile subscribers.

== Satellite phones ==
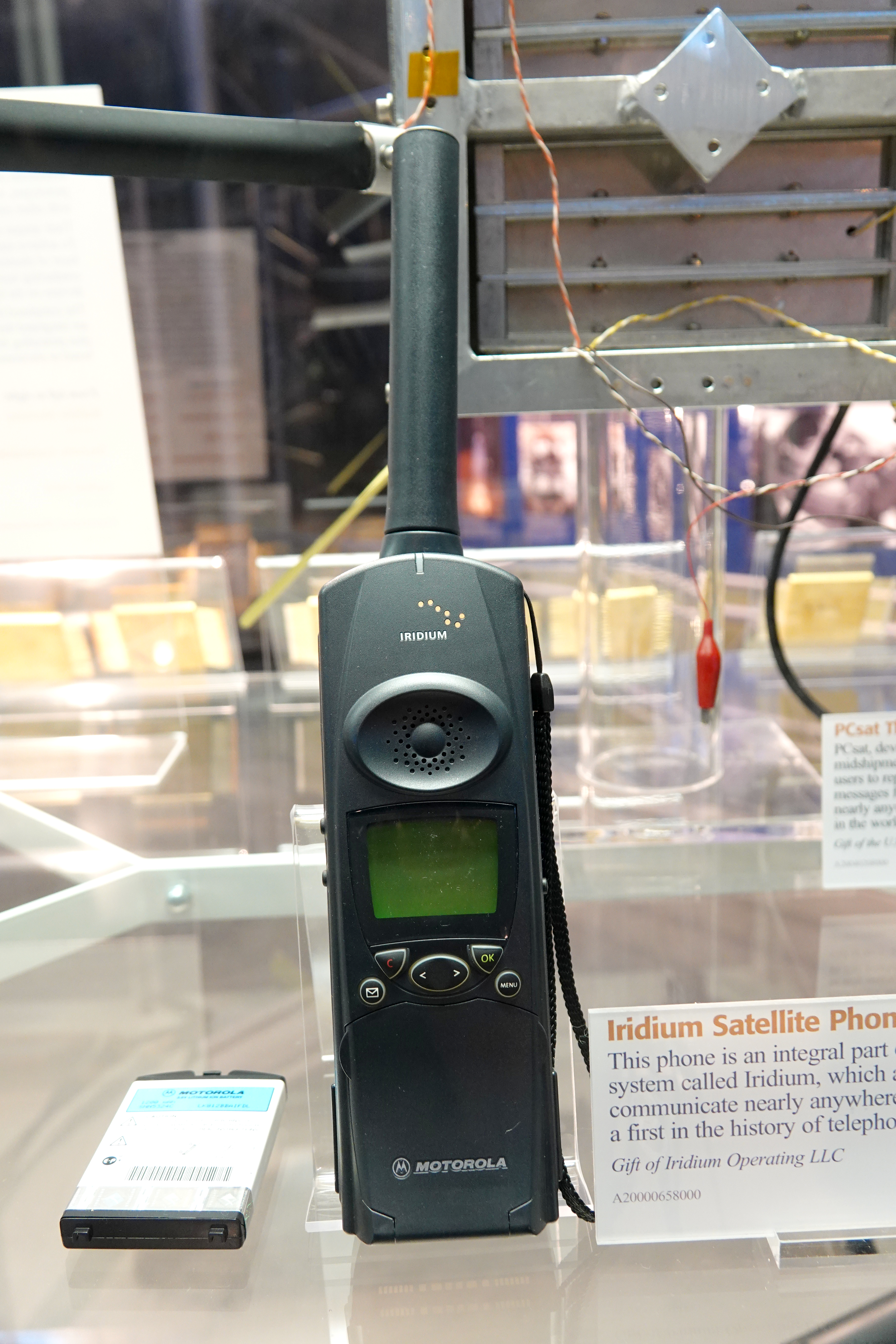
First generation late 1990s Iridium satellite phone

A satellite telephone, or satphone, is a type of mobile phone that connects to other phones or the telephone network by radio link through satellites orbiting the Earth instead of terrestrial cell sites, as cellphones do. Therefore, they can work in most geographic locations on the Earth's surface, as long as open sky and the line-of-sight between the phone and the satellite is provided. Depending on the architecture of a particular system, coverage may include the entire Earth or only specific regions. Satellite phones provide similar functionality to terrestrial mobile telephones; voice calling, text messaging, and low-bandwidth Internet access are supported through most systems. The advantage of a satellite phone is that it can be used in such regions where local terrestrial communication infrastructures, such as landline and cellular networks, are not available.

Satellite phones are popular on expeditions into remote locations, hunting, fishing, maritime sector, humanitarian missions, business trips, and mining in hard-to-reach areas, where there is no reliable cellular service. Satellite telephones rarely get disrupted by natural disasters on Earth or human actions such as war, so they have proven to be dependable communication tools in emergency situations, when the local communications system can be compromised.

== See also ==
- Bell System – American telephone service monopoly (1877–1984)
- Bell Telephone Memorial – Monument in Brantford, Ontario, Canada
- Cellular network – Telecommunications networks transmitted by radio waves
- Cordless telephone – Portable telephone that connects to a landline
- Harvard sentences – Test phrases for voice recording
- Index of telephone-related articles
- Jipp curve – Graph that plots density of telephones against GDP
- List of telephone operating companies
- Mobile operating system – Operating system that operates a mobile device
- Multimedia messaging service (MMS) – Standard for electronic messages
- Party line (telephony) – Type of shared telephone line
- Phone hacking – Surveillance or computer investigation
- Radiotelephone – Communications system for transmission of speech over radio
- Satellite phone – Type of mobile phone
- SIM card – Integrated circuit card for mobile devices
- Spamming – Unsolicited electronic messages, especially advertisements
- Telephone jack and plug – Connectors for wiring of telephone equipment
- Telephone keypad – Keypad that appears on some telephones
- Telephone tapping – Third-party monitoring of electronic communications
- Tip and ring – Conductors of a telephone line
- Videophone – Real-time video communication
