= History of the telephone in the United States =

The telephone played a major communications role in American history from the 1876 publication of its first patent by Alexander Graham Bell onward. In the 20th century the American Telephone and Telegraph Company (AT&T) dominated the telecommunication market as the at times largest company in the world, until it was broken up in 1982 and replaced by a system of competitors.

Originally targeted at business users and upscale families, by the 1920s the "phone" became widely popular in the general population. Ordinary people either subscribed to telephone service themselves, or used a telephone in the neighborhood, including public pay telephones. Long-distance service was metered and much more expensive than local, flat-rate calling. Ordinary Americans contacted businesses, friends, and relatives. Business-to-business communication was important, and increasingly displaced telegrams.

The technology steadily advanced. Starting around the turn of the century, the dial telephone allowed users to place calls themselves without operator assistance. By mid-century, mobile radio telephone service became available to free users from fixed locations in some cities.

The arrival of the smartphone in the early 21st century provided every user a small mobile computer with microphone and speaker, that was bundled with powerful features, such as cameras and Internet access by operation of apps. It could easily send text messages, which tended to displace voice calls.

In 1945, forty-five percent of American households had a telephone. By 1957, that number had reached seventy-five percent, and by 1970, over 90 percent.

In 2002, a majority of U.S. survey respondents reported having a mobile phone. In January 2013, a majority of U.S. survey respondents reported owning a smartphone. In 2024 the Pew Research Center reports that 98% of Americans own a cellphone of some kind, with 91% owning a smartphone.

== AT&T and the Bell System ==
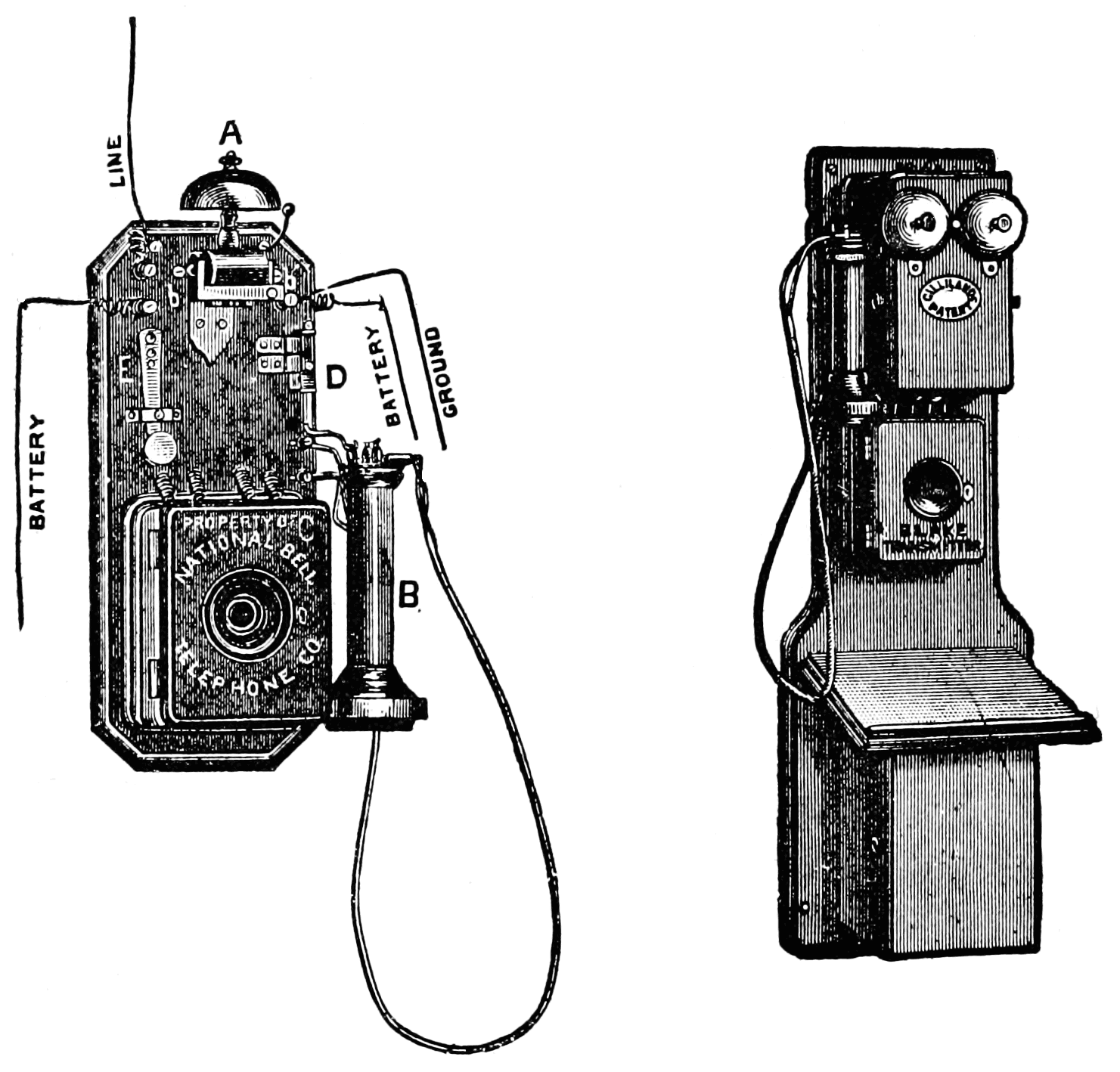
Wall telephones by the National Bell Telephone Company (left) and by Gilliland and Company (right); c. 1880

According to historian Robert W Garnet, in the six years after Bell's invention of the telephone in 1876, his new company managed to increase its capital from a small amount to US$10 million (equivalent to $330 million in 2025). Furthermore, the company struck a deal with Western Union, the giant telegram company, preventing them from entering the telephone market. It acquired a controlling interest in the Western Electric Manufacturing Company to manufacture telephone equipment and supplies exclusively. It invested in local exchanges throughout the country which led to standardization and more business for Western Electric. This dramatic transformation was primarily due to the backing of New England financiers, who not only supplied essential cash, but also recruited experienced managers, such as Theodore Newton Vail to construct and manage a nationwide system. Vail, for example, had been superintendent of the Post Office's Railway Mail Service, which was in charge of intercity movement of mail. Alexander Graham Bell moved back and forth to Canada, and his Bell Telephone Company of Canada, although nominally separate, was in practice largely dependent on American Bell/AT&T, for capital, equipment, policy, and priorities.

=== American Bell Telephone Company (1881–1899) ===
In 1881, President William Hathaway Forbes of the newly renamed American Bell Telephone Company issued the first annual report indicating that the 1880 profits were over US$200,000 (equivalent to $6,672,000 in 2025), and it now operated 133,692 telephones. It set a policy that it leased telephones to customers (by the month) and retained ownership. It always installed (and removed) the telephones it owned. Only nine cities were left in the United States with populations over 10,000 that did not yet have a telephone exchange. The young company spent heavily on lawsuits over patents, which it usually won. It reported profits of over US$500,000 in 1881 and nearly US$1 million in 1882 (equivalent to $30 million in 2025). Typical charges for businesses were US$150 for a thousand messages (equivalent to $5,004 in 2025). Pay stations were being set up around the business district, charging 15 cents per call (equivalent to $5.81 in 2025). American Bell would send a team to make a pitch to business leaders in a city about starting a branch. They had advantages: Bell's national prestige guaranteed an attentive audience. Bell would provide the expertise and equipment. it manufactured the gear and sold only to affiliates. A Bell setup meant good local service and the very good long-distance service, which was otherwise unavailable in that city.

=== AT&T (1899–1982) ===
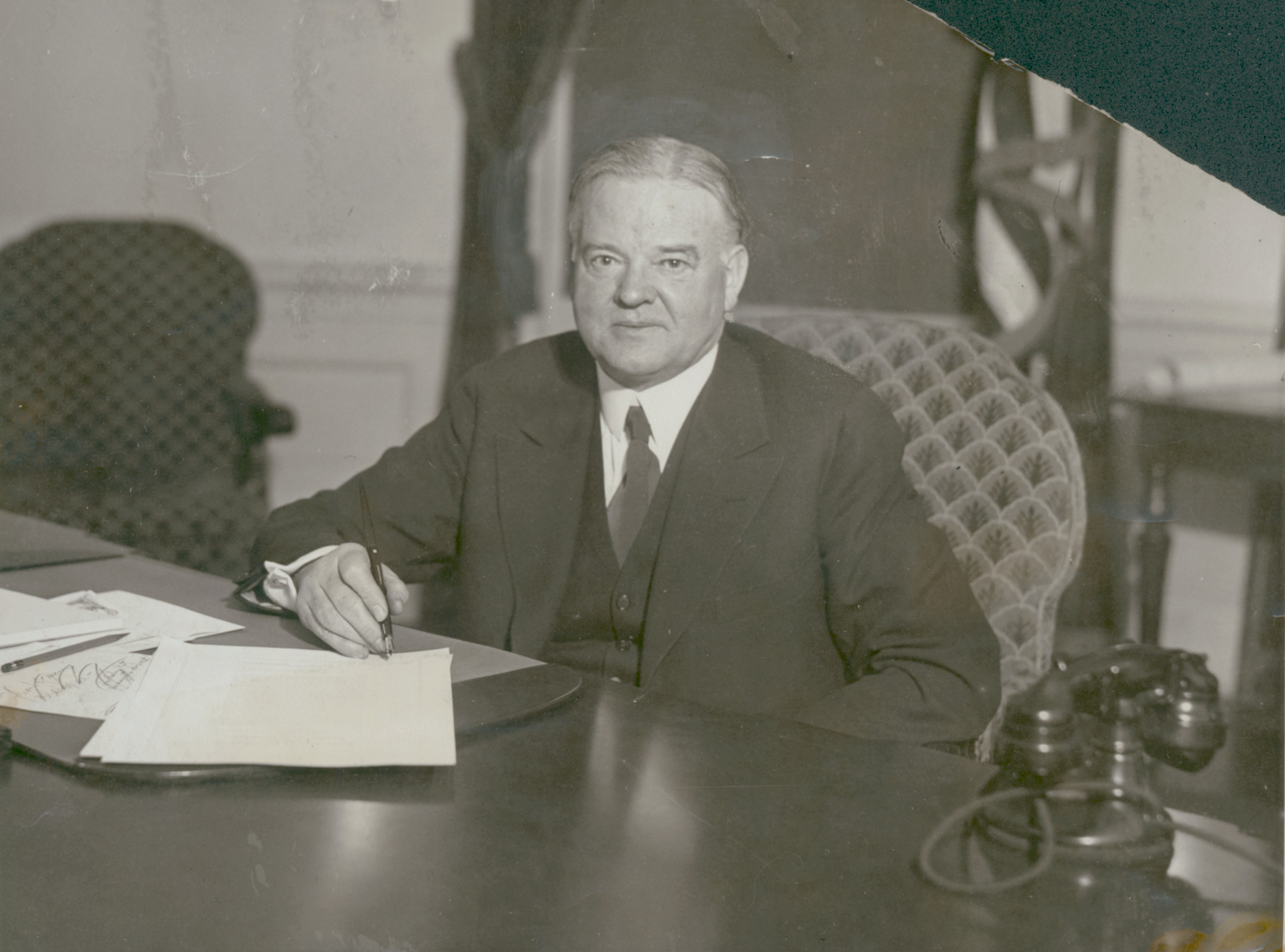
President Herbert Hoover sitting at his desk on December 20, 1930. This is the first photograph taken of Hoover in the White House, as well as the first photograph of a telephone sitting on the desk of a president.

AT&T was a successor of the original Bell Telephone Company founded by Alexander Graham Bell in 1877. The American Bell Telephone Company formed the American Telephone and Telegraph Company (AT&T) subsidiary in 1885. Its role was long-distance service. In 1899, AT&T became the parent company after the American Bell Telephone Company sold its assets to its subsidiary. After AT&T blocked independents from its long-distance service, and bought control of telegraph monopoly Western Union in 1907, antitrust activists launched an opposition. The Kingsbury Commitment in 1913 was the resulting compromise with the federal government to prevent legal action by the government. In return for the government's agreement not to pursue a case against the company as a monopolist, AT&T agreed to divest the controlling interest it had acquired in the Western Union telegraph company, and to allow non-competing independent telephone companies to interconnect with the AT&T long-distance network. In 1921, the Willis Graham Act amended Kingsbury to allow the Interstate Commerce Commission to approve AT&T purchases of other telephone companies. AT&T took quick advantage and by 1930, 80% of the nation's telephones were owned by AT&T, and 98% of the remainder connected to its network.

During most of the 20th century, due to federal agreements, AT&T maintained a monopoly on telephone service in the United States. It was usually the largest company in the U.S. in terms of assets. In 1900, the Bell system plant was valued at $181 million; operating revenue included $32 million from local calls and $12 million from long-distance calls. The net income was $13.4 million. The payroll comprised 37,000 employees. By 1920, assets were $1.4 billion; local revenue was $301 million; long-distance revenue was $142 million; profit was $48 million, and there were 231,000 employees. By 1950, assets had climbed to $10.3 billion; local call revenue was $2.0 billion and toll revenue was $1.2 billion, with a profit of $367 million, and 535,000 employees. Inflation measured by the price index was 24.3 in 1900, 65.4 in 1920, and 80.2 in 1950, For the year 1927, the number of calls in the U.S. was 29 billion, or 5.4 calls per telephone per day.

=== Research priority ===
Historian Leonard S. Reich (1985) argues that in the early 1900s, AT&T and other companies established research labs as a defensive measure against competitors threatening their core businesses. Despite AT&T's very large investment in its telephone system, it faced fierce competition from smaller regional firms. To maintain dominance, AT&T concentrated on creating a nationwide telephone system that provided good technology and the widest possible long-distance service. A key invention that would leave the competition far behind, would be a repeater device to allow coast-to-coast telephone transmission. This research became even more pressing when the engineers realized that the device would also be pivotal for radio development, which had the potential to render wired communication obsolete. The vacuum tube was the critical device. AT&T did not invent it but did purchase the patent and then significantly improved it. AT&T continued research to reinforce its existing telephone system. The research philosophy, according to Frank B. Jewett, the research director, centered around science's usefulness in the systematic advancement of electrical communication. The vacuum tube thus played a critical role in the company's success in both telephone and radio industries.

=== Targeting an audience ===
The Bell company manufactured its own telephone gear in the Western Electric subsidiary founded in 1869. Large local businesses and upscale customers were the first target, in an era when a dollar a day was good pay for a worker. In one of the first newspaper ads for the new telephone, the Bell Telephone Association stated: "The terms for leasing two telephones for social purposes connecting a dwelling house with any other building will be $20 a year; for business purposes $40 a year, payable semi-annually in advance."

Theodore Vail, president of AT&T (1907–1919) and his successors Harry Bates Thayer (1919–1925) and Walter Sherman Gifford (1925–1948) gave heavy emphasis and large budgets to advanced engineering innovation. This was shown by the upgrading of the Western Electric Engineering Department to the Bell Telephone Laboratories in 1925. Research often led to opportunities for increased automation. In particular, the proposed dial telephones would sharply reduce payroll expenses. Company executives were worried about the negative effects of depersonalization and the possibility of labor strikes. Vail and his inner circle exhibited great caution and hesitancy in adopting the new Bell dial telephone system. They cited multiple reasons involving societal, cultural, economic, technical, and labor concerns. One key reason was their awareness that telephone users were pleased that the switchboard operators acted as personal assistants, and this supposed role helped increase demand across all segments of the working population.

Initially telephone companies had designed their product with a primary focus on emergency situations and business needs. They ignored its potential for social interaction. Vail recognized the importance of educating the public about the social opportunities created by the telephone. To achieve this, he hired J. D. Ellsworth to create a nationwide advertising campaign. By the 1930s, telephone companies were promoting this aspect of their service with the slogan, "Reach out, reach out and touch someone!".

==== Urban public telephones ====
The telephone booth, where one could use a coin to make a call, was introduced in the 1890s by William Gray. By 2000 there were 2 million public pay telephones. Only 300,000 pay telephones remained in service by 2014, with the largest concentration in New York City, and they were nearly all gone by 2020.

==== Rural telephone service ====
AT&T usually ignored high-cost low-profit service to farmers. Many small independents operated decentralized, locally owned and locally oriented telephone networks that offered cheaper but mediocre quality service to a small towns and rural areas, and did not provide long distance. By 1912 there were 3200 rural telephone systems, reaching 6000 in 1927. Most were not-for-profit cooperatives that were owned by the users who leased the telephones. When the Great Depression hit after 1929 rural farmers were especially likely to discontinue the telephone. In 1949 most farms in the North, but few in the South, had electricity. Nationally only one in three had a telephone. Starting that year, the Rural Electrification Administration (REA) gave out grants and low interest loans to help local independents in rural areas to expand the telephone service.

=== Breakup of AT&T in 1982 ===
In the 1974 United States v. AT&T antitrust lawsuit the U.S. Justice Department and AT&T reached a compromise in 1982 that included the divestiture of AT&T's ("Ma Bell") local operating subsidiaries. They regrouped into seven Regional Bell Operating Companies (RBOCs), commonly referred to as "Baby Bells", resulting in seven independent companies. Critics were divided on whether the decision was good for the economy.

== Cellphones and smartphones ==
From Finland the Nokia 1011 was introduced in 1992, as the first mass-market battery-powered portable cell phone. From Canada the BlackBerry Pearl reached an upscale market after 2006 when T-Mobile US bundled it to subscribers.

By 2000 most of the 111 million cell phone subscribers talked on them while driving. Many local and state jurisdictions considered bans. The industry claimed cell phones are no more dangerous than listening to car radios. Furthermore, they argued that increased productivity and their necessity in emergencies outweigh the safety factor. By 2015 most states prohibited drivers from texting and talking on handheld cell phones. They cut usage about in half but did not reduce traffic accidents because only the careful drivers stopped using phones.

Smartphones became popular in the early 2000s, when BlackBerry and Nokia introduced their innovative models. BlackBerry was particularly successful in the business market, thanks to its emphasis on email-by-phone. Meanwhile, Nokia was popular among consumers due to its user-friendly interface and attractive design. In 2007, Apple revolutionized the industry with the introduction of the iPhone. The iPhone's touch screen interface, sleek design, and extensive app store quickly made it the most popular smartphone on the market. Android, a mobile operating system developed by Google, was introduced in 2008 and quickly became the most popular operating system for non-Apple smartphones. The new rivals demolished BlackBerry and Nokia sales. Since then, smartphones have continued to evolve, with advancements in technology and major producers based in South Korea and China. Today, billions of people around the world rely on smartphones for communication, entertainment, and productivity. In India, they have replaced currency, checks and credit cards. During the COVID-19 pandemic in 2020–2022, smartphones enabled millions of employees to work remotely, accessing work emails, documents, spreadsheets and other important information from their phones, and meeting together on platforms like Zoom. Likewise many schools operated remotely, but with negative results for student learning.

== Personnel ==
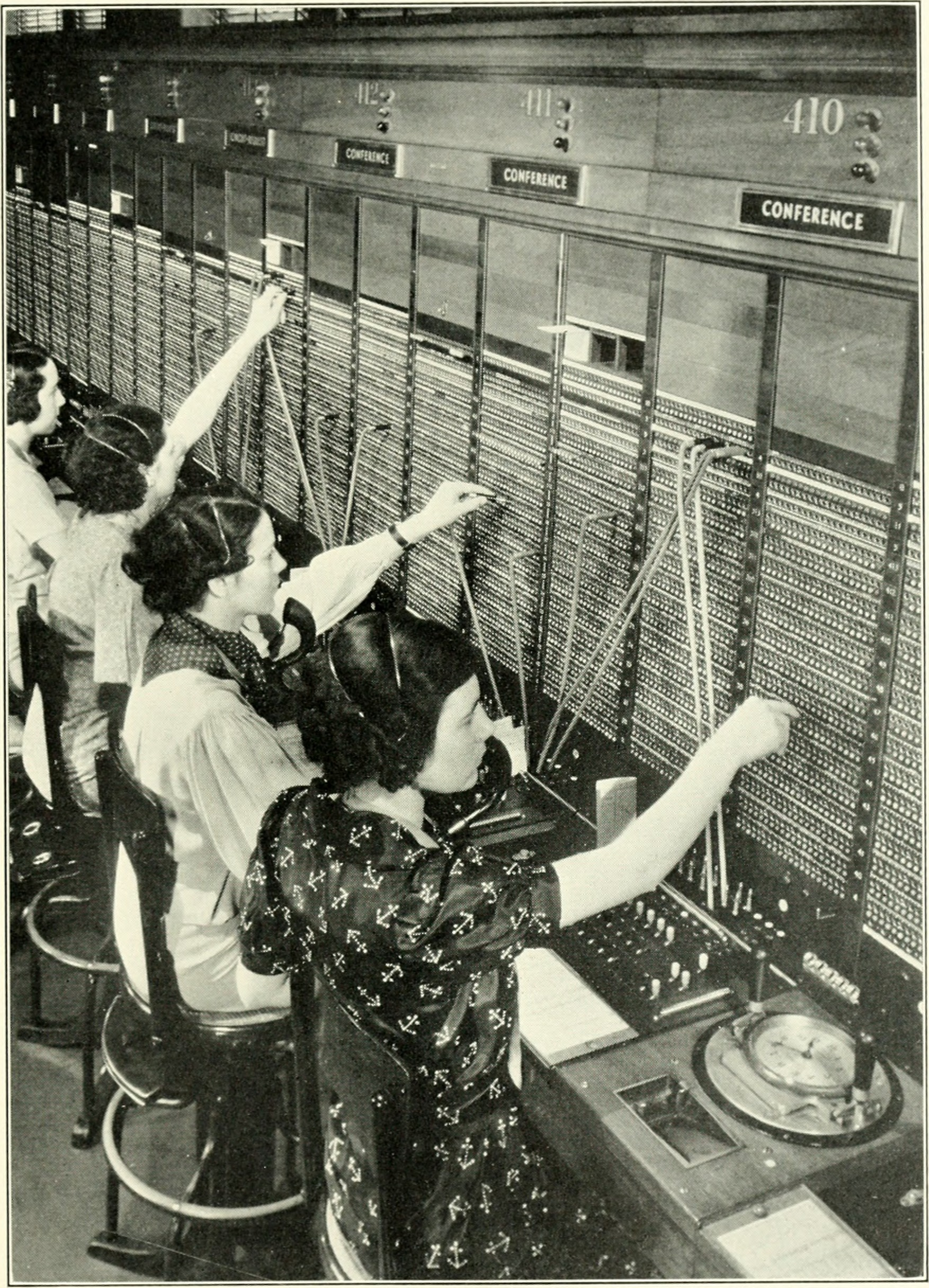
Telephone switchboard in 1922

=== Switchboard and operators ===
Switchboards and operators were an integral part of the telecommunications system until the introduction of electronic switching systems in the mid-20th century.

Before the dial telephone arrived, the telephone exchange with telephone switchboards and operators played a crucial role in connecting telephone calls. A telephone switchboard is a device that allows telephone lines to be interconnected, enabling the routing of calls between different telephones or telephone networks. The switchboard operator was a person who manually connected calls by plugging and unplugging cords on the switchboard. The role of the switchboard and operator was important because they were responsible for connecting callers with the correct party and ensuring that calls were completed correctly. They handled emergency calls for medical, police or fire help. They also provided help with making long-distance calls, directory assistance, and getting needed repairs. Dial telephones replaced the operators. They were invented in the 1930s but took decades to become standard. New Hampshire switched to dials town by town starting in the largest city in 1950 and finishing in a remote village in 1973.

Dorothy M. Johnson, who later became a famous writer, started as a part-time relief operator at age 14 in Whitefish, Montana, in the early 1920s. It was a prestigious job for ambitious young middle class woman in a small logging town who needed money for college. The role demanded quick decision-making, meticulous attention to detail, a very good memory for names, and the ability to handle criticism. Switchboard technology was a demanding task, involving numerous plugs, keys, lights, connecting cords, and complicated protocols for establishing connections. The full-time operators were on duty 56 hours per week, and while they often grumbled about being overworked by a harsh boss, Johnson says they were reasonably compensated at $50 a month.

According to Kenneth Lipartito, AT&T had the option of reducing costs by replacing women operators but waited twenty years before actually doing so. Senior management had recognized the importance of women operators to their competitive advantage and had chosen to modify existing technology to accommodate this labor force, rather than replacing them with automatic switches. Ultimately, the decision to automate was driven by the success of this strategy in establishing a national network that had become too extensive and intricate to be handled manually. The final decision was not based on cost considerations.

While many of the functions of the switchboard and operator have been automated, telephone operators still play a role in some contexts, such as in emergency services or customer support centers. Thus according to a 1995 study, the operators who provide directory assistance, "serve as experts in a variety of domains of relevance to their customers' lives, helping them to navigate through government agencies, complex business hierarchies, partially remembered geographies, and dynamic changes in their customers' worlds."

The most famous group of American operators were the Hello Girls in the "Women of the Signal Corps Female Telephone Operators Unit" of the American Expeditionary Forces in 1917–1919. They were bilingual female switchboard operators sent to France in the World War I. These 223 women were not formally recognized for their military service until 1978.

Operators were rule-followers, but according to April Middeljans, in drama, film, and magazines, they were often portrayed as rule-breaking rebels who challenged societal norms. Through disaster tales, detective stories, and romantic comedies, fiction writers suggest that operators were not just controlled by society, but rather played an active role in regulating it and shaping the lives of their clients and themselves. The female protagonists in these stories were motivated by their curiosity and empathy, and valued human connections over automated ones. By utilizing the switchboard's power, they aimed to achieve their own ideals of societal betterment. These stories reflect a deep admiration for strong female leads and a preference for human ingenuity and decision-making over machine efficiency.

=== Labor force: bias for and against women ===
In the 1880s, when telephone switchboards were introduced, the task of connecting subscribers was initially assigned to teenage boys. However, their unruly conduct, defiance of authority, and impolite demeanor towards customers resulted in their replacement by women, who were considered, "all the things that were described by the vanished word 'ladylike'--calm, gracious, diffident, never profane." The managers observed that women were generally more courteous to callers, and women's labor was cheaper as women were paid from one half to one quarter of a man's salary. In the United States, any switchboard operator employed by an independently owned public telephone company which had not more than seven hundred and fifty stations was excluded from the Equal Pay Act of 1963. In November 1970, AT&T requested a rate increase from the Federal Communications Commission. Meanwhile, the National Organization for Women (NOW) had been pushing the federal Equal Employment Opportunity Commission (EEOC) to challenge the long-standing policy of not promoting women. AT&T had 700,000 employees and was one of the most important companies in the nation. EEOC now seized the opportunity and intervened in the rate request. It alleged that AT&T was using the rate hike to offset the inefficiencies stemming from its discriminatory practices. The FCC now launched an inquiry into these allegations, and the EEOC, equipped with enforcement powers, conducted hearings on AT&T's employment practices. As a result, AT&T was found guilty of violating Title VII of the 1964 Civil Rights Act, which prohibited sex discrimination in employment. A series of consent decrees were enacted between 1973 and 1979, mandating that AT&T establish affirmative action and upgrade and transfer programs, and provide back pay to individuals who were previously denied promotions due to their gender.

==== Strikes ====
Julia O'Connor, a former telephone operator, led the Telephone Operators' Strike of 1919 and the Telephone Operators' Strike of 1923 against New England Telephone Company on behalf of the IBEW Telephone Operators' Department for better wages and working conditions. In the 1919 strike, after five days, Postmaster General Burleson agreed to negotiate an agreement between the union and the telephone company, resulting in an increase in pay for the operators and recognition of the right to bargain collectively. However, the 1923 strike was called off after less than a month without achieving any of its goals.

In the 1920s the Bell System crushed independent unions, replacing them with company unions that did not negotiate contracts. After 1929, the Great Depression hit the industry hard, as telephone service was easy to discontinue when family income dropped. The Bell System found payrolls were the easiest place to save money, and its work force plunged 40% from 1929 to 1933. By 1930 the Bell System had converted a third of its telephones to dials, and dropped 70,000 operator jobs. By 1934, half the telephones were dial.

=== Hawthorne studies ===
Western Electric's Hawthorne plant near Chicago was the scene of famous studies into worker behavior. AT&T had a deep commitment to research, and now became innovative in applying research methodology to personnel problems. AT&T wanted the technically best products, but it also wanted the most efficient workers. Starting in 1924 it brought in the National Research Council to run experiments that used test rooms to measure the effects of brighter or dimmer overhead lighting. Brighter and dimmer lights both improved productivity, but productivity fell when the experiment stopped. The conclusion was that being part of an experiment increased productivity temporarily. Management now brought in Harvard Business School Professor Elton Mayo who brought in a team of psychologists who interviewed workers in depth to see how social relations affected productivity. Did workers became more productive when supervisors were more informal and friendly, or when they were more strict? Mayo concluded that a happy workplace and higher productivity resulted when supervisors treated workers like patients, to discover their grievances and treating their problems with diplomacy and tact, while maintaining the upper hand. However another researcher, anthropologist Lloyd Warner argued the experiments proved something different: supervisors must understand the culture of the shop floor, and create incentive systems that are congruent with that culture.

=== Employee benefits ===
According to Jill E. Cooper, AT&T in 1913 responded to growing criticism of the working conditions for its switchboard operators. It implemented an employee benefit plan, which was managed by a medical department and provided benefits for sickness, disability, and a retirement pension. The company faced growing public scrutiny in the 1920s over reports of health problems, specifically nervous disorders, resulting from the stress of operating the switchboard. AT&T then launched new preventive programs. These included in-house courses such as the "General Health Course" and "Design for Living Course," as well as company-owned rest homes. These programs were well received by the public and the employees.

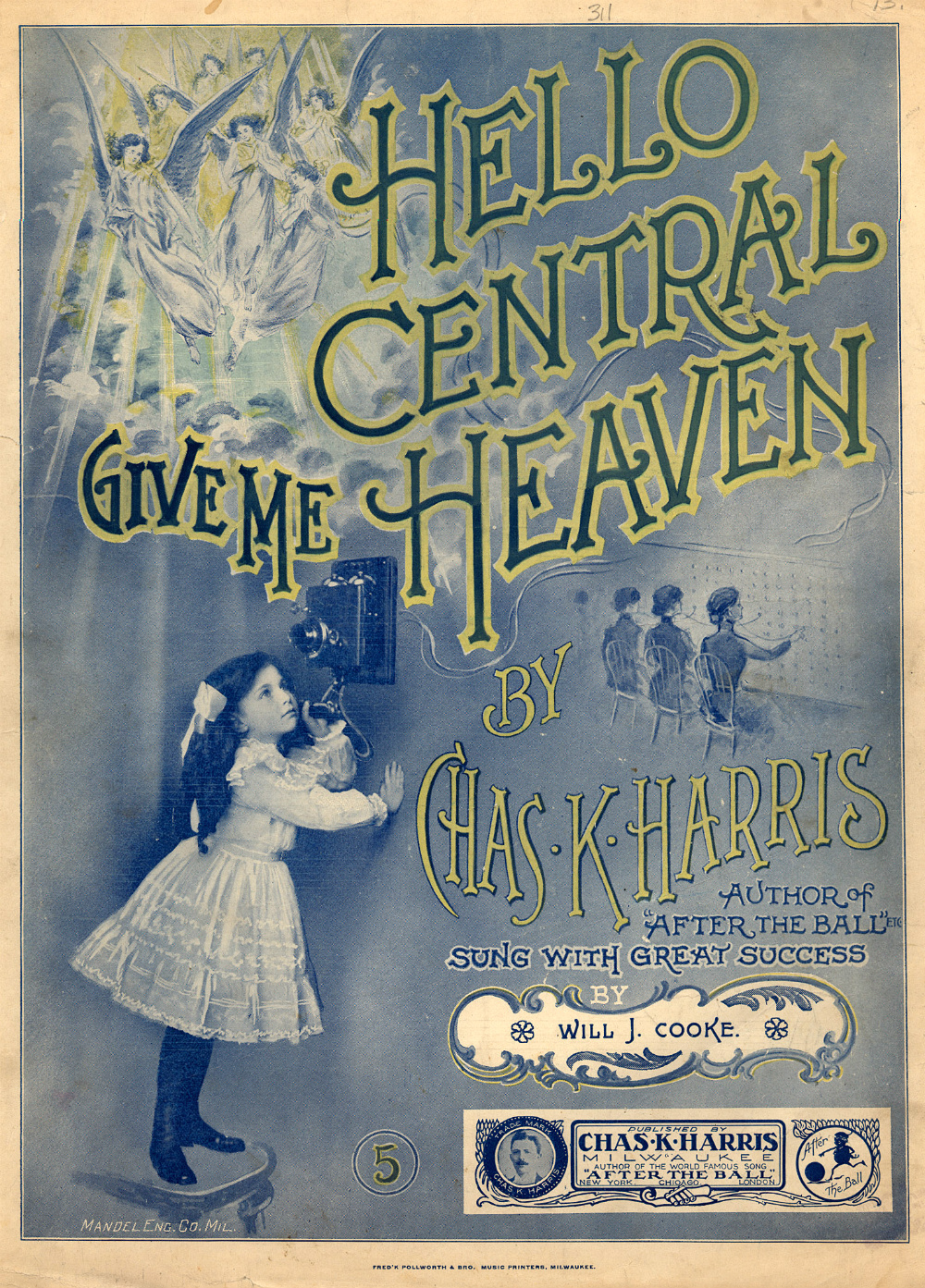
1901 song about a well-dressed orphan calling her dead mother from an expensive home telephone.

== Users ==
Over 650 telephone songs were published before 1937 with titles such as: "Hello Central, Give Me Heaven"; "Hello is this Heaven? Is Grandpa there?"; "Loved by Telephone"; and "The Bell Went Ting-a-Ling."

=== Business ===
The telephone had a significant impact on American business in the early 20th century, transforming the way that companies conducted their operations and interacted with customers. In 1891 the Long Island, New York, phone company counted its 7322 commercial subscribers: 937 physicians and hospitals, 401 drug stores, 363 liquor stores, 315 livery stables, 162 metal-working plants, 146 lawyers, 126 contractors, 100 printing shops, and so on. In addition there were 1442 residential subscribers, mostly doctors and business owners. The telephone made it much easier for businesses to communicate with customers, suppliers, and other companies, as long as no written record was needed such as telegrams and the mail provided. Telephones allowed for quick and efficient communication, making it possible to make deals, place orders, follow up on delivery times, and handle customer service inquiries in a timely manner. The telephone allowed businesses to take orders, which could then be fulfilled and shipped to customers. It was adopted soonest when speed was critical, as in for doctors and hospitals. The telephone also made it possible for different departments inside a company to communicate with each other more efficiently, improving coordination and workflow. For example, a sales team working in the downtown office district could call the factory located on the outskirts of the city regarding the status of a particular order.

=== Housewives ===
As upscale households acquired the first residential telephones starting in the late 19th century, the wife at home all day found new uses. It was available for emergencies, but those calls were infrequent. Daily shopping was a priority. Most stores delivered, and now they could take orders by telephone from regular customers. As upscale families moved out of inner city apartments to single-family dwellings, travel became more of a problem. Upscale households bought automobiles after 1910, but few housewives were drivers. The telephone solved the separation problem and made socializing with family and friends much easier and more frequent. The informal telephone increasingly replaced the formal visit. Michele Martin argues that in rural areas in the North, independent telephone companies created party line systems with relaxed usage rules and lower rates, making phones accessible to most homes. These communities were tightly knit socially despite being geographically dispersed. These factors led to the development of unique telephone norms in rural areas. For example, listening to others' conversations on party lines was not considered eavesdropping but rather a way to participate in community life. Rural party lines were often used for organizing church activities and conducting business among farmers. These unexpected uses of the telephone by women influenced telephone companies to recognize its value beyond business, leading to the development of a "telephone culture." Overall, the telephone's impact on society was complex and influenced by various factors, including gender, location, and social norms.

=== Gender and culture roles ===
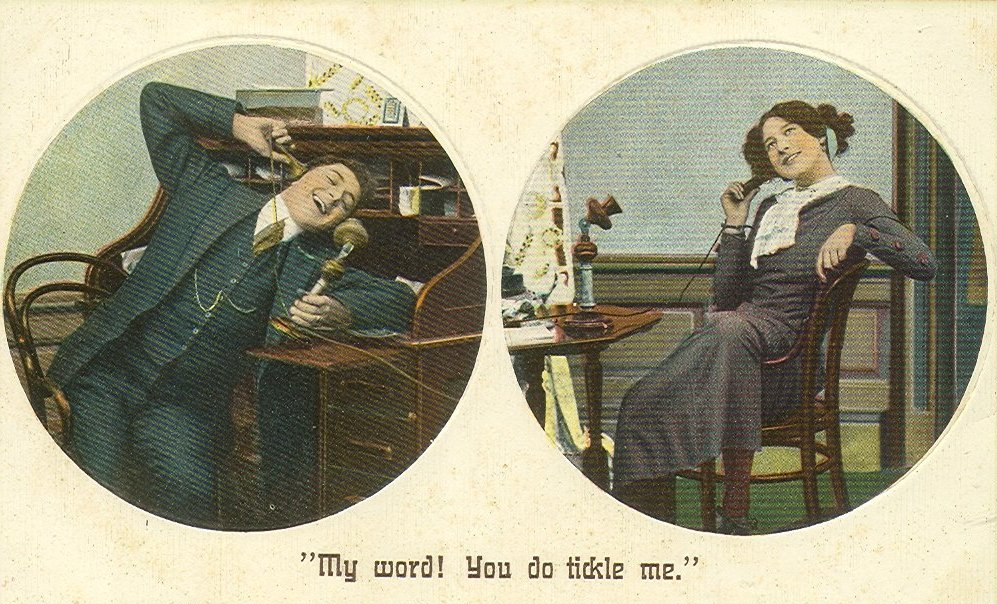
Private conversation, 1910

Historian John Brooks argues that the telephone created "a new habit of mind—a habit of tenseness and alertness, of demanding and expecting immediate results, whether in business, love or other forms of social intercourse." The telephone was instrumental to modernization. It aided in the development of suburbs and the separation of homes and businesses, but also became a reason for the separation between women occupying the private sphere and men in the public sphere. Both historically and currently, women are predominantly responsible for the telephone calls that bridge the public and private sphere, such as calls regarding doctor's appointments and meetings.

Men and women use telephones in different manner. For example, women tend to use their telephones more for social interaction and maintaining relationships with friends and family, while men use telephones more for work-related purposes and entertainment. Today there are differences in the types of apps and features that men and women use on their telephones. Women use social media apps more frequently than men, while men are more likely to use gaming or sports apps.

=== Telemarketing ===
Telemarketing is the contacting, qualifying, and canvassing of prospective customers using telecommunications devices such as telephone and Internet. Telemarketing is a method of direct marketing in which a salesperson solicits prospective customers to buy products, subscriptions or services, either by telephone call or through a subsequent face to face appointment scheduled during the call. Telemarketing can also include robocalls—recorded sales pitches programmed to be played over the telephone by automatic dialing. Many people complain about nuisance robocalls. Telemarketers based outside the U.S. can ignore "Do Not Call" lists. Telemarketing techniques are increasingly used in political campaigns. Because of First Amendment free-speech protestions, state laws governing political telephone calls are much less stringent than those applying to commercial messages. Even so, a number of states have barred or restricted political robocalls. Get Out the Vote Campaigns (GOTV) calls are an effective way to spend money in 21st century election campaigns.

Telemarketing fraud is a major issue, especially when exploiting the more susceptible elderly population.

=== 9-1-1 ===
The 911 emergency call service started in the late 1960s for people with dial telephones to quickly and easily obtain emergency services. Until then people had to find the number for a nearby police or fire station or hospital, and speak directly to someone who might not be prepared to handle emergencies. By 1979 about 800 local 9-1-1 systems were operational. In terms of population coverage, by 1979, 26% of the U.S. population could dial the number. This increased to 50% by 1987, 93% by 2000; as of March 2022, 98.9% had access. The cost is paid by a fee on the monthly bill of telephone subscribers.

=== Harassing calls ===
Brooks notes that during the social unrest of the late 1960s there was a sharply increased rate of abusive, obscene, and threatening calls. According to Michael D. Smith and Norman N. Morra, a 1992 Canadian nationwide survey of women found that 83% had received lewd or menacing calls. The most frequent targets were those who were divorced or separated, young women, and those in major urban areas. Most calls came at night when they were home alone. The callers were generally unknown adult men. Few reported these calls to the police or telephone company, and even then, they often did not receive adequate assistance. Emotionally, most women reported that these calls had affected them, with fear being the most commonly reported response.

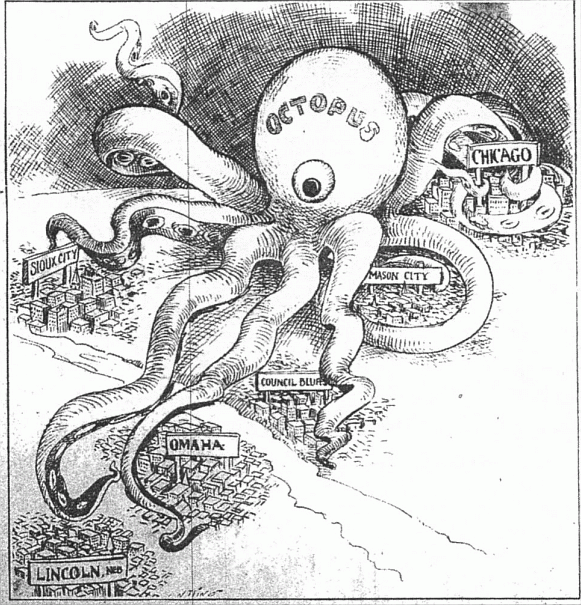
AT&T as a grasping octopus taking control of the independent telephone systems in cities out West. It appeared in Telephony (April 1907) p. 235.

=== Literary fears ===
In the 1890s to 1910s, a particular type of pulp fiction, known as "wire thriller," was written by authors such as Arthur Stringer and Frank L. Packard. Their stories conveyed significant apprehensions about very well-organized criminals. They often had a specific focus on the perils of telephone or telegraph technology and the new danger it enables called "action at a distance," when they wielded power across vast distances. These novels were inspired by the writings of Frank Norris and exaggerated the dangers associated with electronic technology. One plot for example tells of "The Wire Devils," a nefarious team of technically sophisticated thieves, all former inmates of Sing Sing prison. They have hijacked a western railroad's telegraph system and are using it to commit train robberies. A scholarly analysis of these novels reveals that these fears represented a broader concern about the economic and cultural unification of America's regions. This consolidation was seen as a potential threat to established race, class, and gender relationships. To counter such sentiments, AT&T launched a major advertising campaign, endorsing national commercial integration through telephony as a constructive measure. The campaign aimed to mitigate sectional political conflicts while leaving social divisions of race and class unaffected. Since the September 11 attacks in 2001 a similar genre has appeared called "cyber-doom scenarios." These fictional stories depict the aftermath of cyberattacks, which often result in the widespread breakdown of vital infrastructures, causing severe economic damage or even complete societal, economic, or civilizational collapse.

== See also ==
- Timeline of the telephone
- Mobile app
- Index of telephone-related articles
- History of telecommunication
- Party line (telephony)
- Plain old telephone service (POTS), analog system used until 1988 when replaced by Integrated Services Digital Network ISDN) digital transmission
- Private branch exchange
- List of telecommunications companies
- The telegraph in United States history
