= Hello Central, Give Me Heaven =

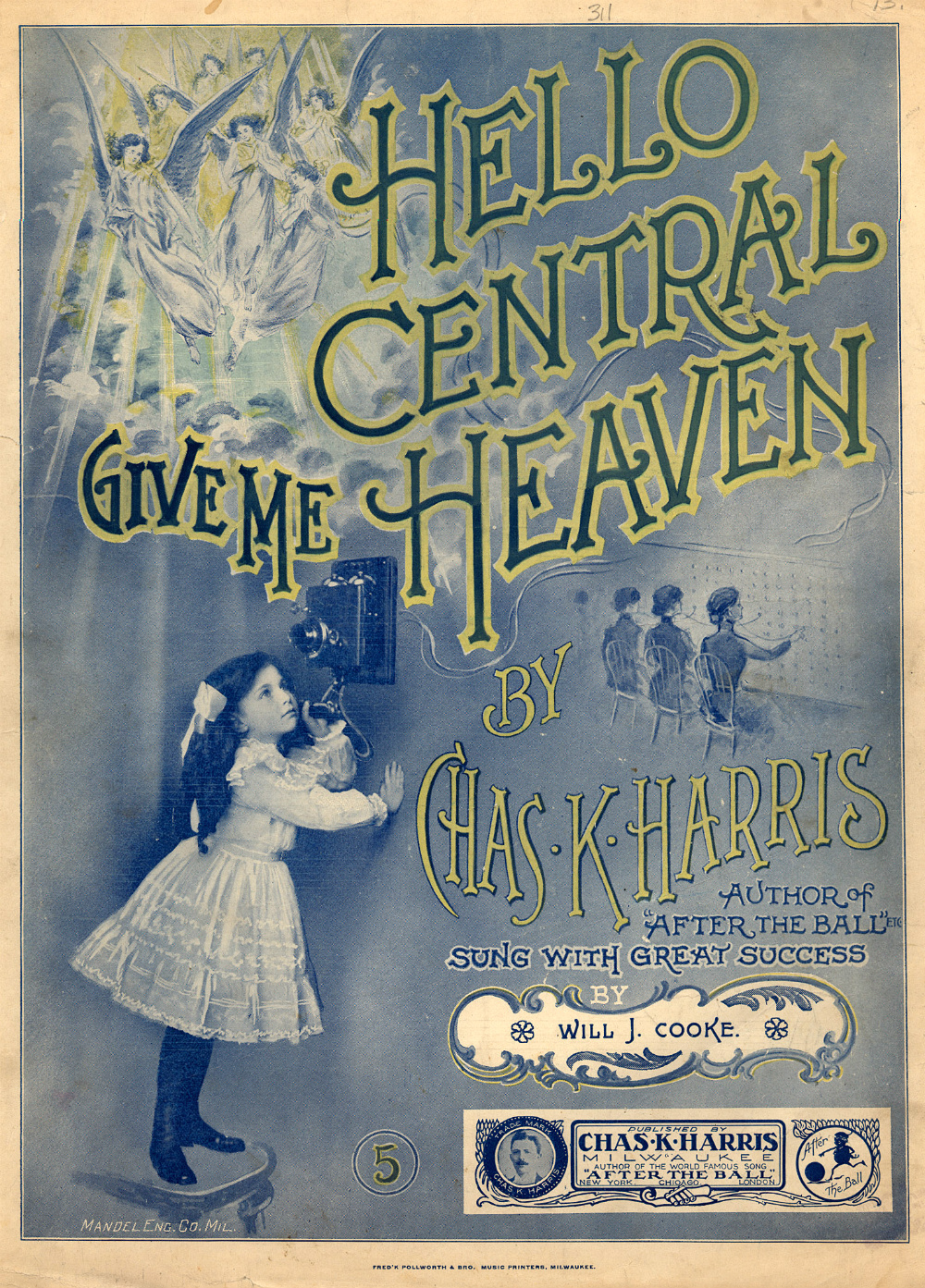

Song by Byron G. Harlan
- Language: English
- Published: 1901
- Songwriter(s): Charles K. Harris

Hello Central, Give Me Heaven is a popular Tin Pan Alley song first published in 1901, with lyrics and music by Charles K. Harris, and was among Harris's most popular songs. It was first recorded by Byron G. Harlan and released in July 1901.

The song relates a young girl wishing to use the telephone ("Hello Central" refers to the operator) to call her dead mother. It was inspired by a newspaper story relating the attempt of the seven-year-old daughter of a widower to make such a call. Postcards were printed after the song's publication with the "kind permission" of Harris showing young girls using the telephone to call their dead mothers.

The song's popularity led to several "telephone songs" in the following years, and a one-reel film of the same title was released in 1913.

It has been estimated that the sheet music sold approximately one million copies.

The Carter Family also recorded a version of the song.

== Lyrics ==
Papa I'm so sad and lonely,
Sobbed a tearful little child
Since dear mama's gone to heaven
Papa darling, you've not smiled
I will speak to her and tell her
That we want her to come home
Just you listen and I'll call her
Through the telephone

Chorus:
Hello Central give me heaven
For my mama's there
You can find her with the angels
on the golden stair
She'll be glad it's me who's speaking
call her, won't you please
For I want to surely tell her
We're so lonely here

When the girl received this message
Coming o'er the telephone
How her heart thrilled in that moment
And the wires seemed to moan
I will answer just to please her
Yes, dear heart, I'll soon come home
Kiss me Mama, kiss your darling
Kiss me through the telephone

== Film ==
A one-reel film of the same title was released in 1913. Prints and/or fragments were found in the Dawson Film Find in 1978.

== See also ==
- The telephone in United States history
