= Ringaround =

In telecommunications, the term ringaround has the following meanings:

1. The improper routing of a call back through a switching center already engaged in attempting to complete the same call.
2. In secondary surveillance radar, the presence of false targets declared as a result of transponder interrogation by side lobes of the interrogating antenna.
