= Jipp curve =

Graph that plots density of telephones against GDP

Jipp curve is a term for a graph plotting the number (density) of telephones against wealth as measured by the Gross Domestic Product (GDP) per capita. The Jipp curve shows across countries that teledensity increases with an increase in wealth or economic development (positive correlation), especially beyond a certain income. In other words, a country's telephone penetration is proportional to its population's buying power. The relationship is sometimes also termed Jipp Law or Jipp's Law.

The Jipp curve has been called "[p]robably the most familiar diagram in the economics of telecommunications". The curve is named after A. Jipp, who was one of the first researchers to publish about the relationship in 1963.

The number of telephones was traditionally measured by the number of landlines, but more recently, mobile phones have been used for the graphs as well. It has even been argued that the Jipp curve (or rather its measures) should be adjusted for countries where mobile phones are more common than landlines, namely for developing countries in Africa.

The term has sometimes been used in analogy for other curves as well, for example as a "postal Jipp curve" plotting letters posted per capita and GDP per capita.
