= Handset =

Telephone component

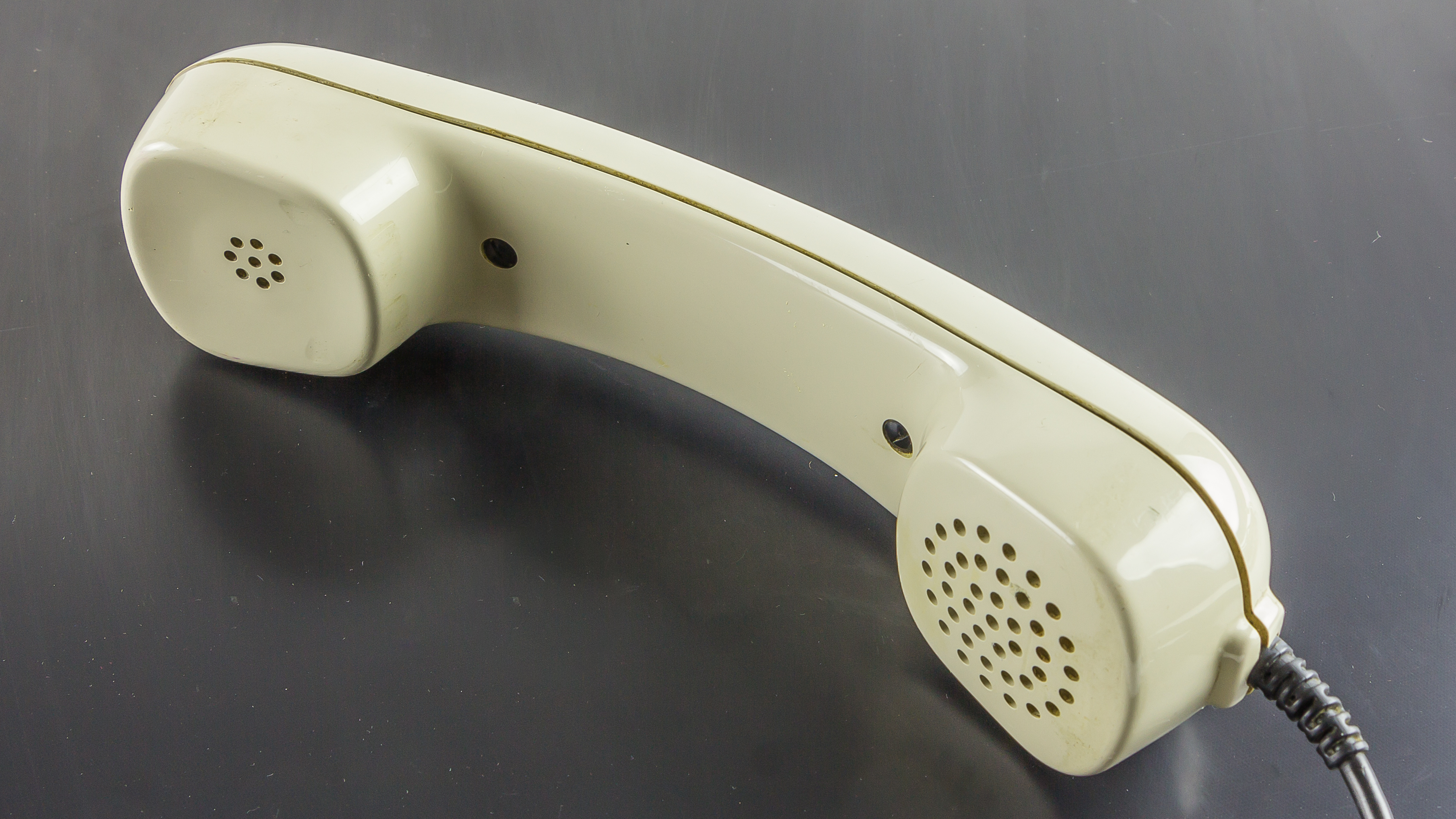
Classic handset

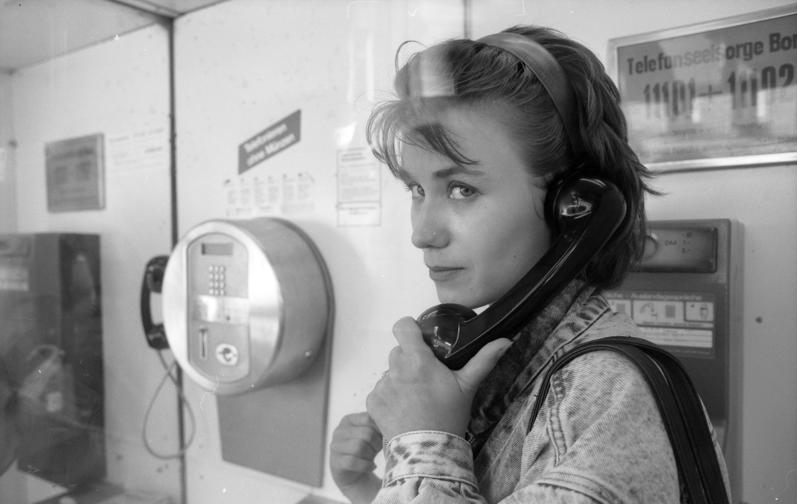
Woman using a telephone handset (West Germany, 1988)

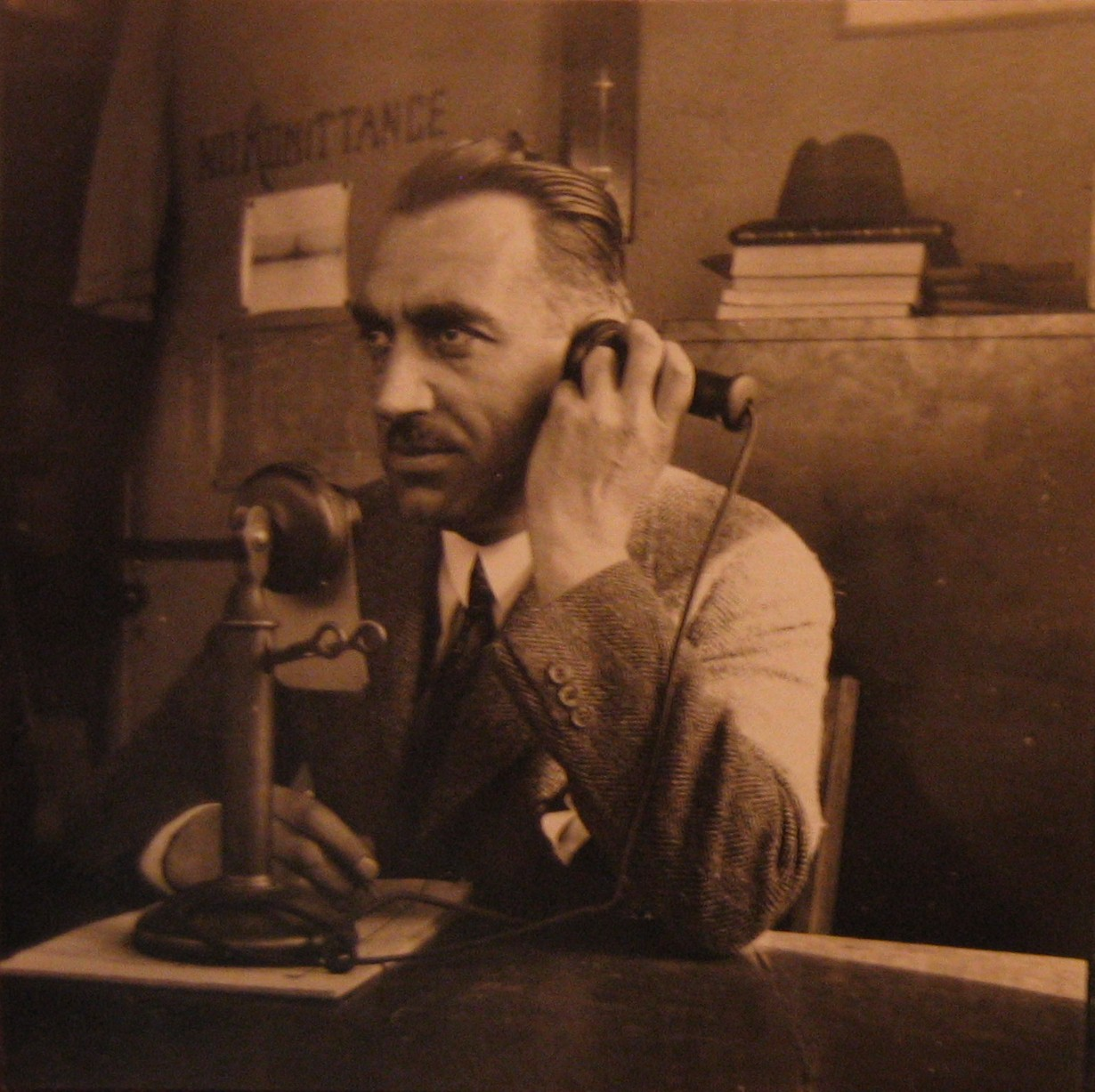
Early 20th century candlestick telephone which required only the receiver to be held to the ear (United States, 1920s–30s)

A handset is a component of a telephone that a user holds to the ear and mouth to receive audio through the receiver and speak to the remote party using the built-in transmitter. In earlier telephones, the transmitter was mounted directly on the telephone itself, which was attached to a wall at a convenient height or placed on a desk or table. Until the advent of the cordless telephone, the handset was usually wired to the base unit, typically by a flexible tinsel wire cord.

The handset of a cordless telephone contains a radio transceiver which relays communication via a base station that is wired to the telephone line. A mobile phone does not require a base station and communicates directly with a cell site in designated frequency bands.

== Handset symbol ==
A graphic symbol that designates a handset is used on cordless and mobile phones to specify placing or ending a telephone call. Usually a button with green upright (off-hook) handset icon is used for starting a call, and a red lying-down (on-hook) handset is used for ending a call. Unicode has the handset symbol U+1F4DE 📞 TELEPHONE RECEIVER commonly faced rightwards to use with face emojis, and also symbols with specified direction: U+1F57B 🕻 LEFT HAND TELEPHONE RECEIVER, and U+1F57D 🕽 RIGHT HAND TELEPHONE RECEIVER.

== See also ==
- Headset (audio)
- PopSocket
- Western Electric hand telephone sets
