= Ringer box =

Telephone signaling device

Western Electric hand telephone set of c. 1930 with its ringer box or subscriber set in the background.

A ringer box is a telephone signaling device, similar to a bell box. It usually contains an electromechanical gong and was used with most early desk stand telephones, such as candlestick telephones and the Western Electric type Western Electric hand telephone sets, which were too small to hold a ringer and other required electrical components. Many pay station telephones also used a separate ringer box.

In telephony, ringer boxes and similar devices are often categorized as subscriber sets.

The ringer contained in the ringer box alerts a call recipient to incoming calls by ringing one or more metallic bells emitting a ringtone.

Ringers were commonly placed in the same housing as the subscriber set, which consisted of other electrical components, such as induction coils, capacitors, and, if required, a magneto generator. The subscriber set interfaced a telephone set to the telephone network, while magneto generators were used in a manual exchange to generate a remote ring signal.

The Western Electric 302-type telephone was the first widely used Bell System telephone to include the ringer and other subscriber set components inside the housing of the telephone set. Almost all telephones manufactured since have an internal phone ringer.

== Components ==
Western Electric common battery subscriber set of c. 1930, containing a bell ringer, an induction coil, and a condenser, mounted underneath the wooden connecting board.

A ringer box consists of a case made of wood, metal, or plastic, containing bells or gongs and an electromagnetically-driven clapper which strikes the gongs when actuated. The electromagnet of the clapper responds to the alternating current sent from a central office exchange or another phone via the telephone network wiring. The direct current required by the telephone's audio circuitry is blocked with a capacitor before entering the ringer to prevent the ringer from being triggered by circuit interruptions and pulse dialing. Typical ring signals ranged from 60 to over 100 Volts at a frequency of 20-30 Hertz.

== Producers ==
Ringer boxes were produced by all manufacturers of customer-premises telephone equipment. In North America, the prominent producers were Western Electric, Automatic Electric, and Kellogg Switchboard & Supply Company, while in Europe companies such as Siemens & Halske and Ericsson mass-produced devices.
