= Model 302 telephone =

Type of American telephone set

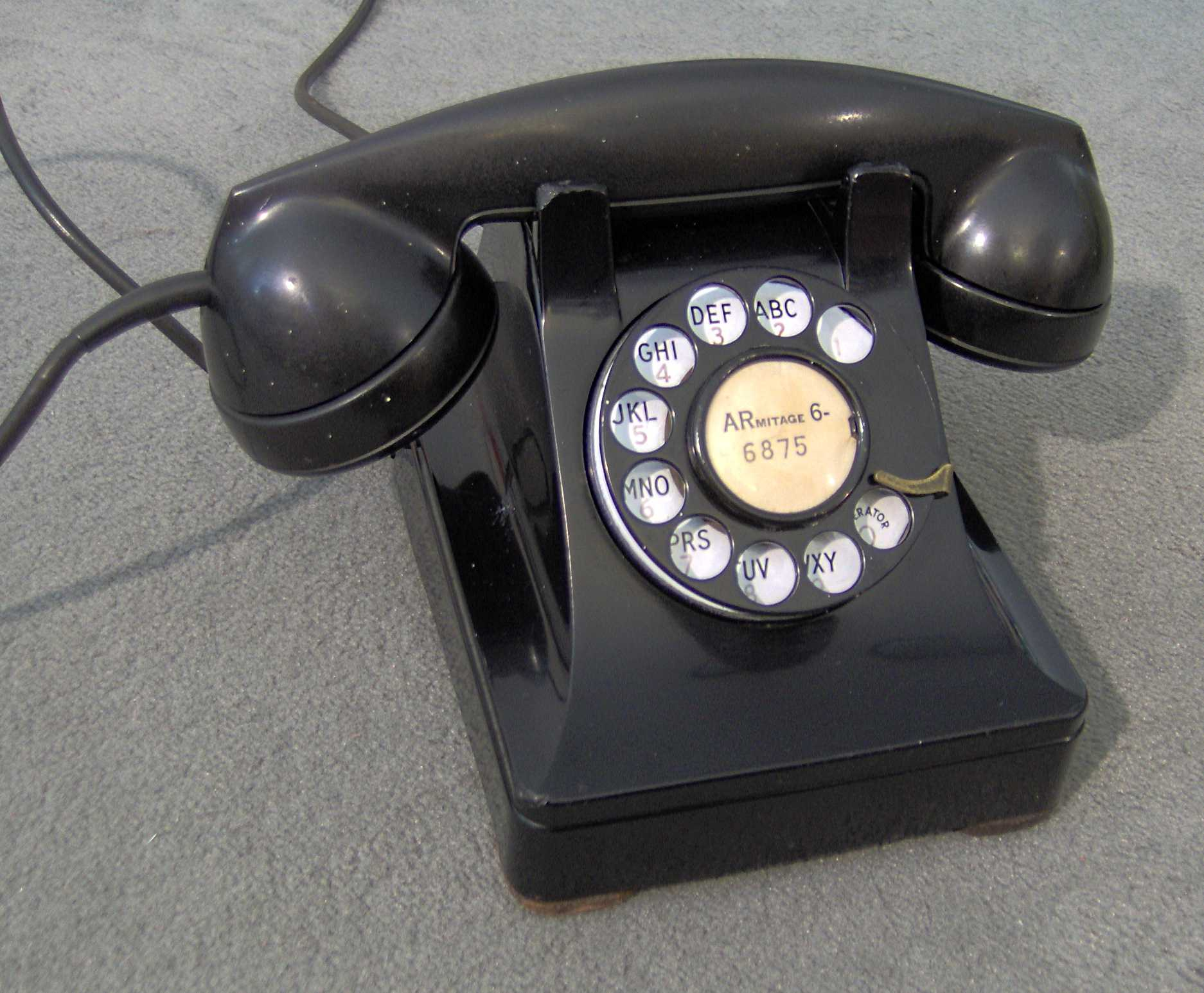
Western Electric 302 telephone with a thermoplastic case

The model 302 telephone is a desk set telephone that was manufactured in the United States by Western Electric from 1937 until 1955, and by Northern Electric in Canada until the late 1950s, until well after the introduction of the 500-type telephone in 1949. The sets were routinely refurbished into the 1960s. It was one of the most widely used American combined telephone sets to include the ringer and network circuitry in the same telephone housing.

== Design and production ==
The design of a new desk telephone for the Bell System began approximately in 1930, only a short time after the introduction of a line of handset telephones, the 102 and 202-type desk telephones. The existing Western Electric telephones comprised a desk set that only served to secure the handset and also the dial for customer-initiated calling, but required an external subscriber set (subset, or desk set box or ringer box), containing the ringer and network circuitry. This box was typically mounted on a wall or desk side. New concepts of design and economic efficiency emerged in Europe, as well as in the independent market in the US, in the 1920s, which combined all components of the telephone in one desk-top unit. The model 302 was the first Western Electric telephone to follow this trend.

Designed by Bell Telephone Laboratories engineer George Lum starting in the early 1930s, the 302-type telephone included such design elements of contemporary technology as, for example, in the Ericsson model DBH 1001 of 1931, conceived in 1929 by the Norwegian artist and designer Jean Heiberg, and the Automatic Electric Type 34 Monophone desk telephone, introduced in 1934.

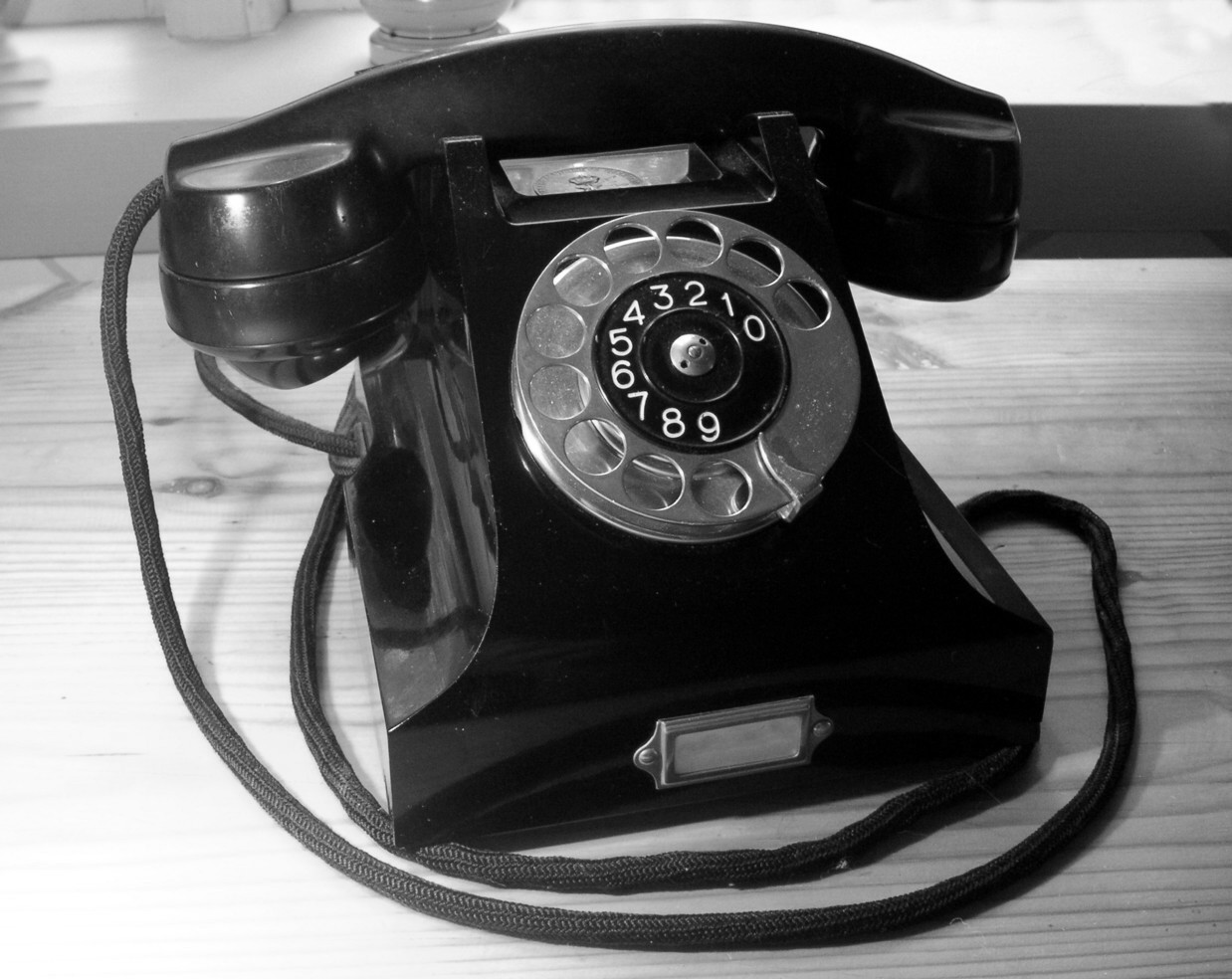
The Ericsson model DBH 1001 of 1931 may have been an influence on the later Model 302 design.

The design evolved during the early part of the 1930s when the Great Depression delayed introduction of all new telephones. After field trials in 1936, large-scale deployment commenced in 1937. The model was never completely retired from service in the Bell System, which ceased to exist in 1984.

The model 302, and a series of similar models for special service types, is designed around a rectangular steel base-plate on which are mounted the ringer unit, the induction coil, a metal container enclosing two capacitors, and a connector terminal plate. The base was supported by four felt- or leather-covered triangular feet attached under each corner to prevent scratching furniture surfaces. The housing sat atop the base, secured with screws, and contained the rotary dial and a handset cradle. The cradle contained two plungers rods which activated the hook switch mounted inside the housing, when the handset was lifted from the cradle.

The majority of 302-series telephones were produced in black, with painted color sets available by 1939 at a surcharge payable by the subscriber. The housing was originally cast from a zinc alloy until production sets were increasingly made from a thermoplastic material, Tenite, by 1941. The thermoplastic housings were available in five colors: ivory, Pekin red, green, blue, and rose pink until telephone production was suspended due to the military material requirements for WW-II by orders of the War Production Board. Post-war telephone production resumed with black plastic housings in 1945 and by 1949 color sets were reintroduced. Requests for custom colors could also be fulfilled, including the traditional dark gold, statuary bronze, old brass, and oxidized silver hues.

All early telephone sets had dials with metal finger wheels, either black or in brushed stainless steel for the color telephones. Starting in 1941, the colored thermoplastic units featured clear plastic finger wheels. Dial number plates were made with a steel substrate for the white vitreous enamel face. Black telephone sets were equipped from the factory with straight brown textile-covered cords until 1952, when synthetic rubber (Neoprene) jacketed cords became standard equipment. Optional retractile coiled cords were available both in textile and rubber jackets since the early 1940s.

The 302 was a rugged and easily repaired desk telephone. Most US telephones were leased to subscribers from the Bell System as part of the monthly service fees. Western Electric also built 302 telephones for sale to independent telephone companies.

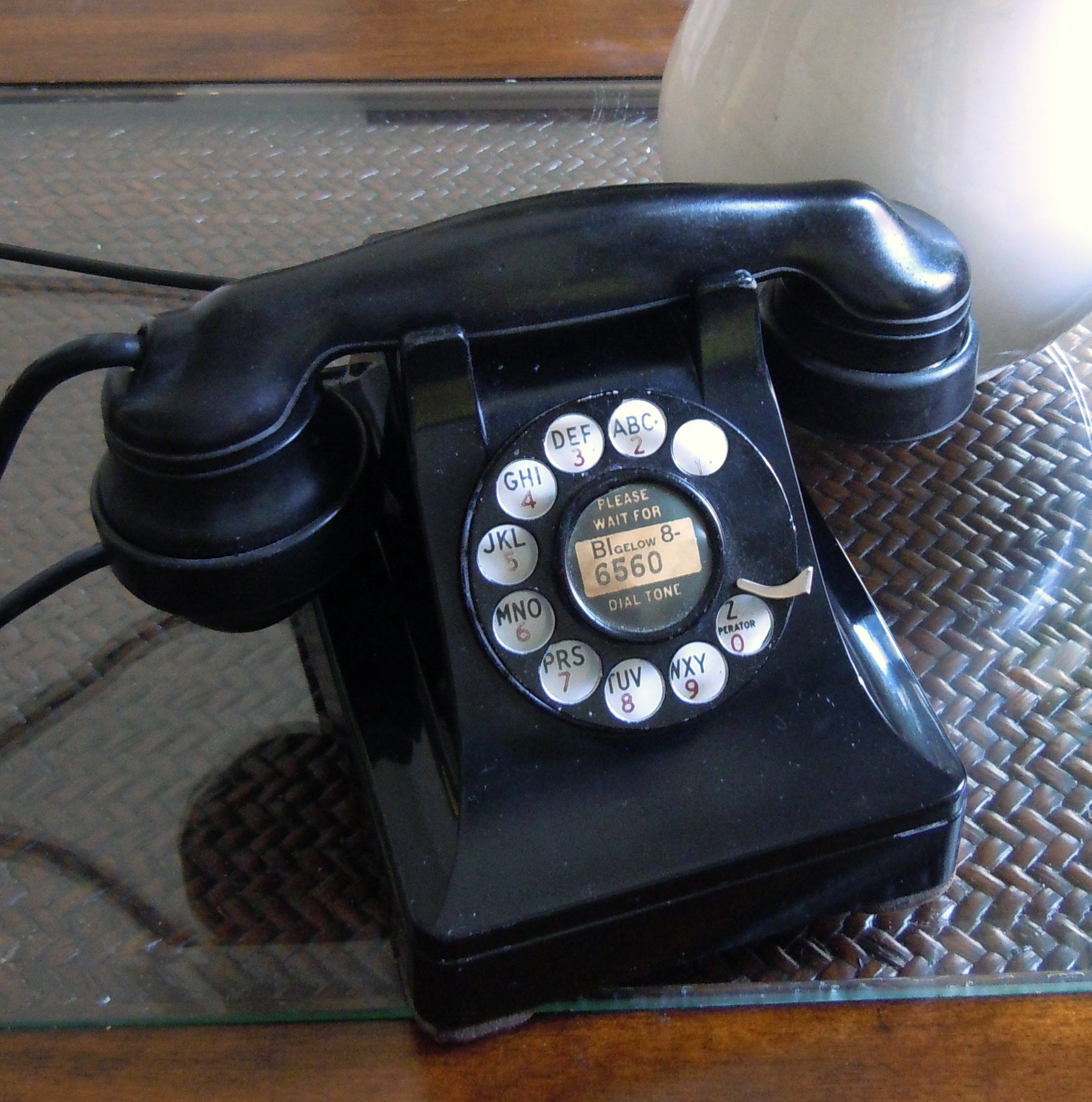
1948 Western Electric 302 telephone set that was refurbished amidst post-war equipment shortages with an older style handset (E1) and installed on a line of the Newark, NJ, exchange "BIgelow", the last existing Panel office when it was dismantled in 1983.

Beginning in August 1955 and extending into the 1960s, the Bell System remanufactured the 302 as the type 5302 in its distribution center work shops, with a newly designed housing and eventually with the G-type handset of the 500-type telephone, which gave the set a similar appearance to the 500.

In addition to the model 302, the Western Electric 300-series included many variations and special purpose types with additional features. Conversion kits using a 302-style housing and F1 handset to replace older manual candlestick telephones with an external subset were available.

== Similar phones by other manufacturers ==
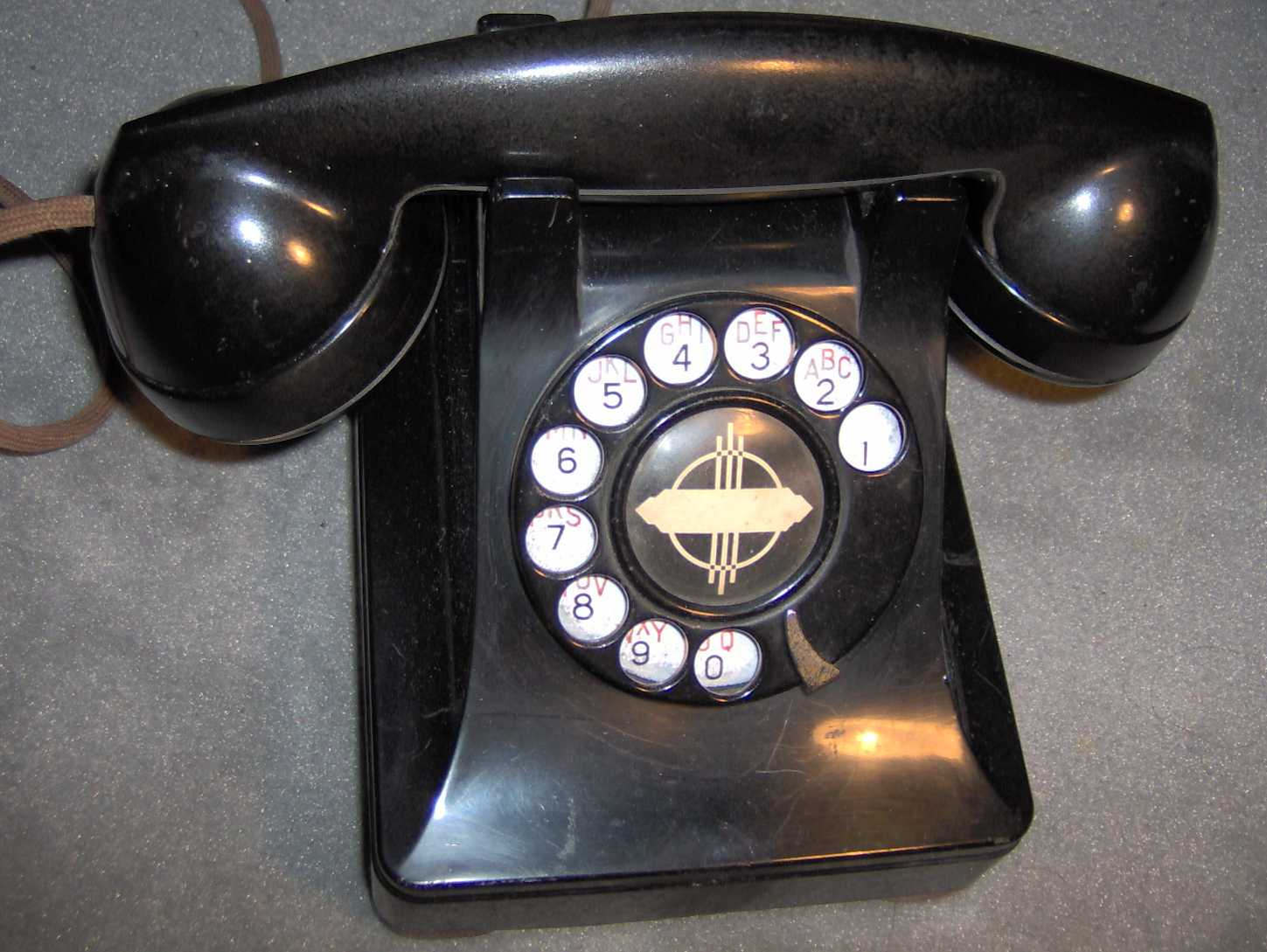
A 1945 Federal Telephone & Radio Type 803, a clone of the 302 using Automatic Electric components for military applications

Other manufacturers produced sets of similar appearance. Among these were the Stromberg-Carlson Model 1243 telephone, distinguished by beveled corners and flanging on the handset, and the Federal Telephone & Radio (FTR) 803 (pictured).

After phase-out in the US, the model 302's exterior design was retained by European Bell branch companies for such models as the 1954 Bell Standard, widely used in the Netherlands and Belgium.

== See also ==
- Western Electric hand telephone sets
