= Telephone magneto =

Hand-cranked electrical generator

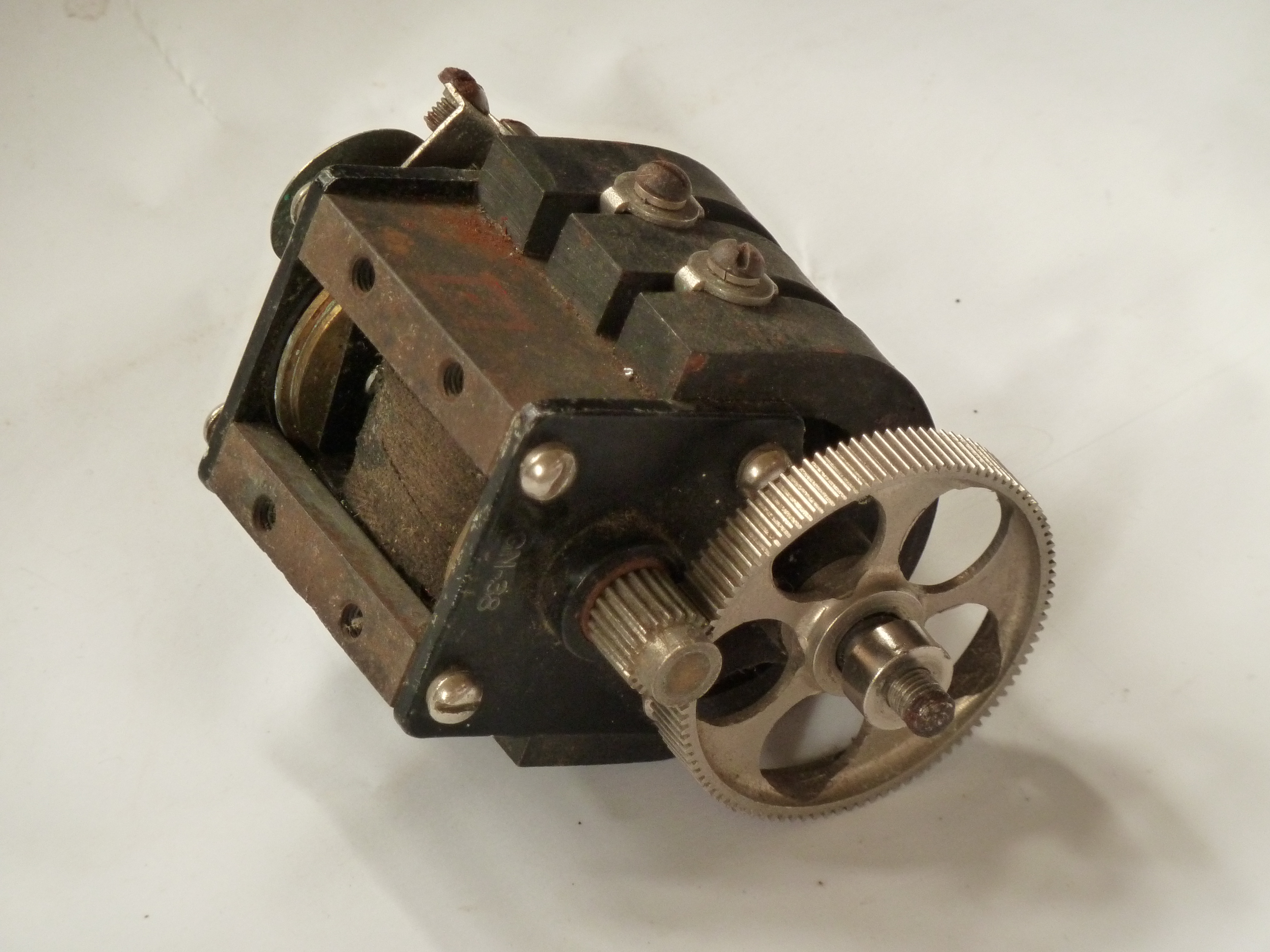
Telephone magneto viewed from beneath shows the armature (inset, left), the horseshoe field magnets, and the gears to drive the rotor

A telephone magneto is a hand-cranked electrical generator that uses permanent magnets to produce alternating current from a rotating armature. In early telegraphy, magnetos were used to power instruments, while in telephony they were used to generate electrical current to drive electromechanical ringers in telephone sets and activate signals on operator consoles.

== Telegraphy ==
Telegraphy pre-dated telephony and magnetos were used to drive some of the early printing telegraph instruments. Manual telegraphy with keys and reception by either a needle instrument or a syphon recorder could be powered by batteries. The later automatic and printing instruments, such as the Wheatstone ABC telegraph, required greater currents that could be delivered by a hand-cranked magneto. A hand-crank was used to rotate a belt drive that increases the rotational speed of an armature with a pair of coils between the poles of a stationary horseshoe magnet.

== Telephony ==
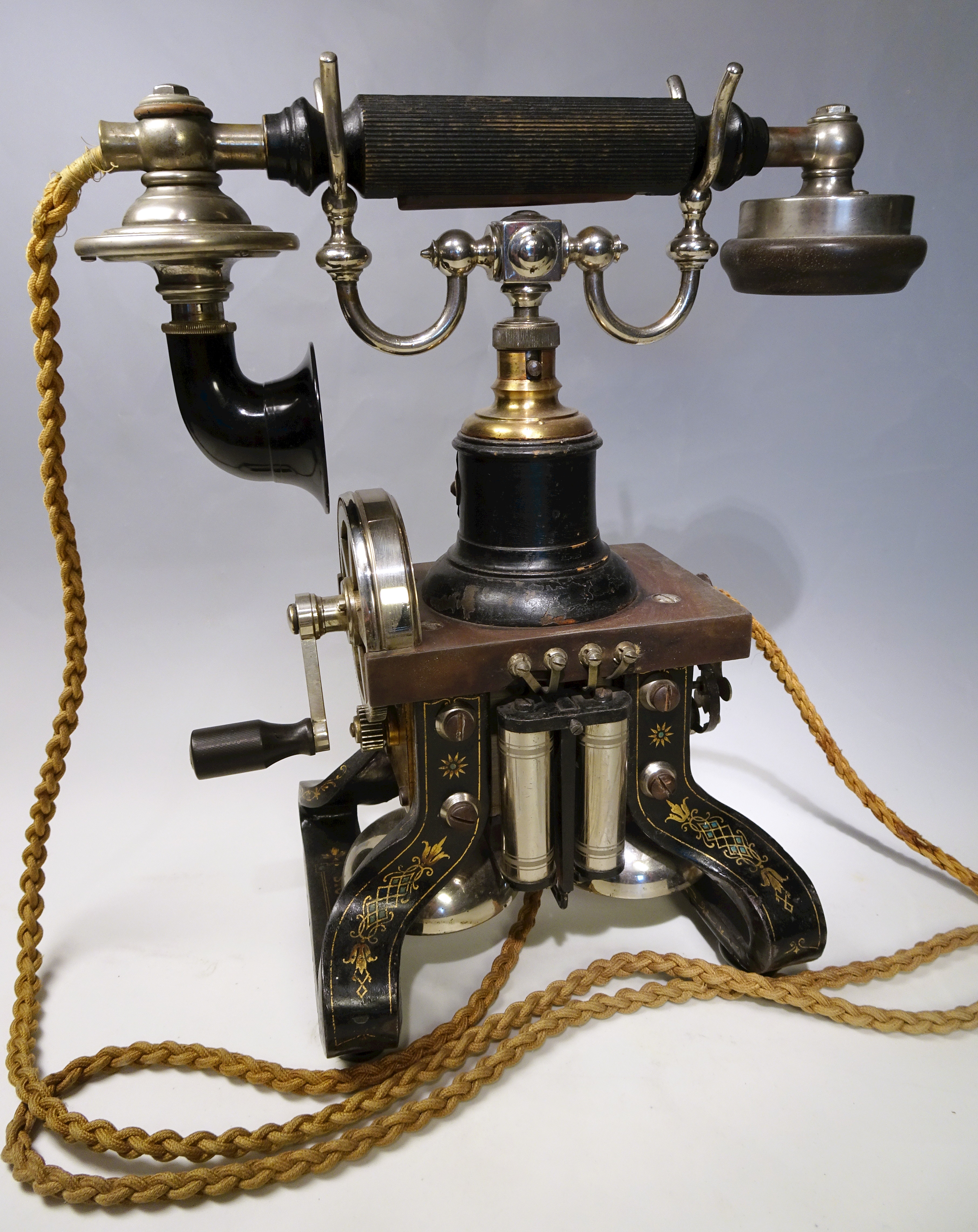
Ericsson Dachshund telephone of 1892 featuring an integrated magneto driven by the handle on the left. The legs of this instrument are actually the permanent magnets for the magneto.

Many early manual telephones had an attached hand-cranked magneto that produced an alternating current (AC) at 50–100 V for signaling to ring the bells of other telephones on the same (party) line, and to alert an operator at the local telephone exchange. These were most common on long rural lines served by small manual exchanges which did not use a common battery circuit. The telephone instrument obtained talking current by powering a carbon microphone with a local battery, consisting of "N° 6" zinc–carbon dry cells. By around 1900, large racks of motor–generator sets in the telephone exchange could supply this ringing current remotely instead and the local magneto was often no longer required, but their use continued into the mid-20th century.

Telephone magnetos featured a large gear rotated by hand with a handle, that drove a much smaller gear on the armature rotor, providing a high gear-ratio to increase the rotational speed of the magneto armature. A mechanical switch on the output terminals engaged only when the rotor was turning, so that the magneto was normally disconnected from the telephone circuitry.

Ringing current magnetos were used in the public switched telephone network (PSTN) as late as the 1980s, when they were still used in manual private branch exchanges (PBXs), small business switchboards worked by operators. Many such systems obtained ringing power from an extra wire pair from a central office, rather than having a motor generator for such a small installation, which generated noise and required maintenance. Magnetos were used when such a facility was not available, or as a backup source when the facility failed. Unlike in the public telephone network, which has a standard ringing cadence (the repeating pattern of ringing and silence), the ringing cadence when using a magneto depended on the skill of the operator. When ringing local extensions, some switchboard operators used local codes of ringing to indicate internal, external or urgent calls.

Linesman's test sets also included a magneto, for use when ringing out to either the exchange or the subscriber, from anywhere along the line. Their use extended into the 1980s.

== See also ==
- Magneto
- Ringer box
