= Telephone hook =

Component of analog telephones

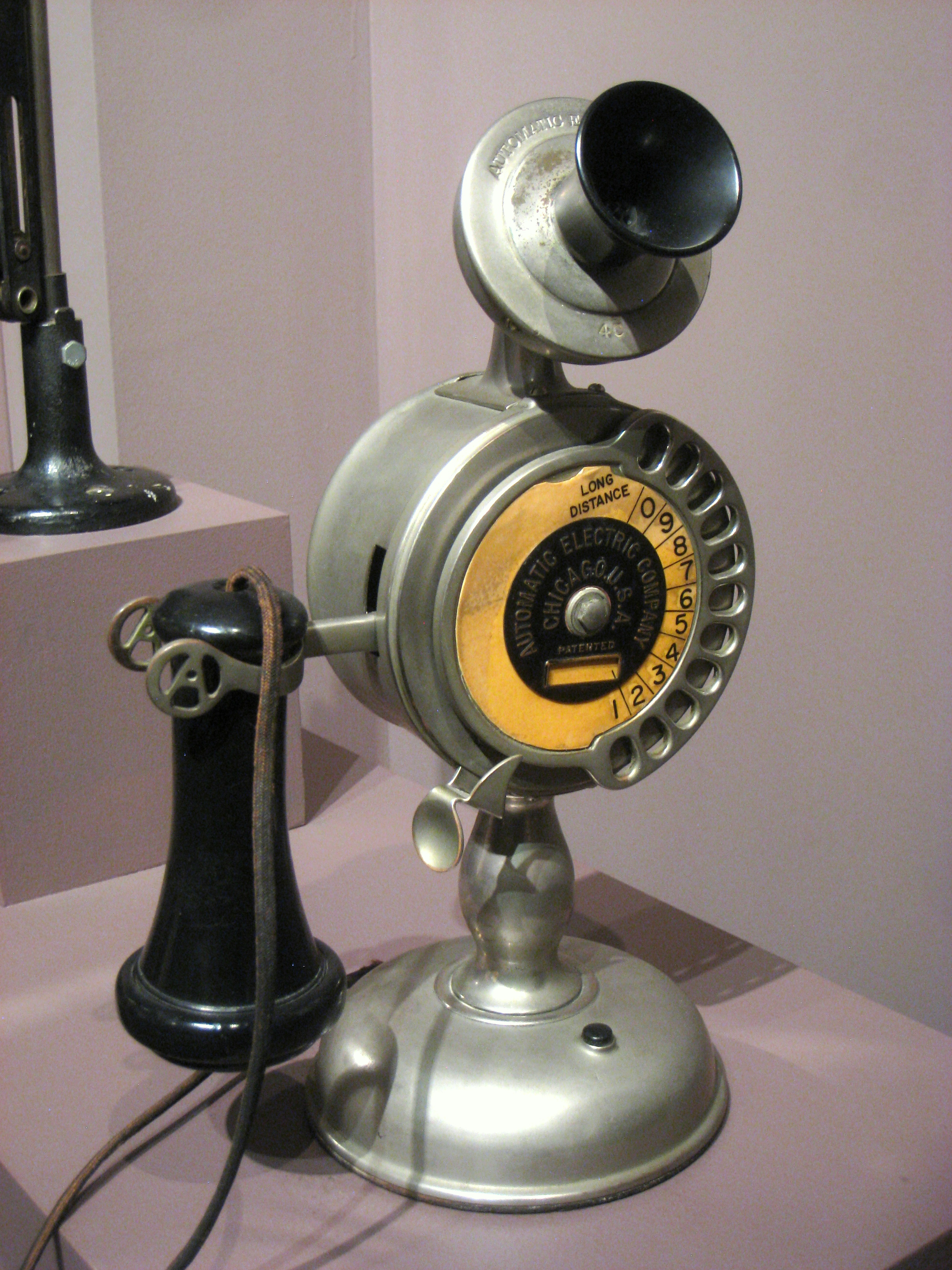
An early telephone manufactured in 1909, known as "Strowger". The black earpiece is seen resting on the hook.

A telephone hook or switchhook is an electrical switch which indicates when the phone is hung up, often with a lever or magnetic button inside the cradle or base where a telephone handset resides. It takes its name from old wooden wall telephones and candlestick telephones, where the mouthpiece was mounted on the telephone box and, due to sidetone considerations, the receiver was separate, on a cable. When the telephone was not in use, the receiver was hung on a spring-loaded hook; its weight would cause the hook to swing down and open an electrical contact, disconnecting the talking circuit from the line. When the handset is on the cradle, the telephone is said to be "on-hook", or ready for a call. When the handset is off the cradle, the telephone is said to be "off-hook", or unable to receive any (further) calls.

Pushing the switchhook briefly is termed a "hook flash".

== Purpose ==
Telephone switchhook separates talking and signaling circuits of the telephone so that only one is active at a time. Before the invention of the switchhook the user had to manually turn the switch. Some users forgot to turn the switch, leaving the telephone off-hook after the end of the call.

== Invention ==
Several people claimed to be the first inventors of the switchhook (such as Thomas A. Watson), but Hilborne Roosevelt managed to get recognition and royalties for his invention. The son of Edwin Holmes claimed to use that device long before their patents.

== See also ==
- Off the Hook – A radio show
- Permanent signal
