= Common battery =

In telecommunications, a common battery is a single electrical power source used to energize more than one circuit, electronic component, equipment, or system.

A common battery is usually a string of electrolytic cells and is usually centrally located to the equipment that it serves. In many telecommunications applications, the common battery is at a nominal −48 VDC. A central office common battery in the battery room supplies power to operate all directly connected instruments. Common battery may include one or more power conversion devices to transform commercial power to direct current, with a rechargeable battery floating across the output.

Before 1891, telephones in the United States always needed a separate power source to supply the subscriber line at each end. Each telephone needed a battery to power the transmitter and a hand generator to help signal the central office to manually connect the line to other subscribers and disconnect the line at the end of each call, and the cost of maintaining all this equipment was a large part of why early telephone service was so expensive. During the 1890s, common batteries became prevalent in telephone company central offices across the United States. They helped drive down the cost of phone service by reducing the complexity of the telephone equipment to be deployed to each subscriber, since each telephone would now draw all the power needed from the central office. The telephone hook replaced the hand generator as the primary method for signaling the exchange for when the line was in use or no longer in use.

The presence of a common battery at the central office also explains why landline telephones can often still work when the regular electrical grid is down.

== See also ==
- List of battery types
