= Candlestick telephone =

Type of early telephone

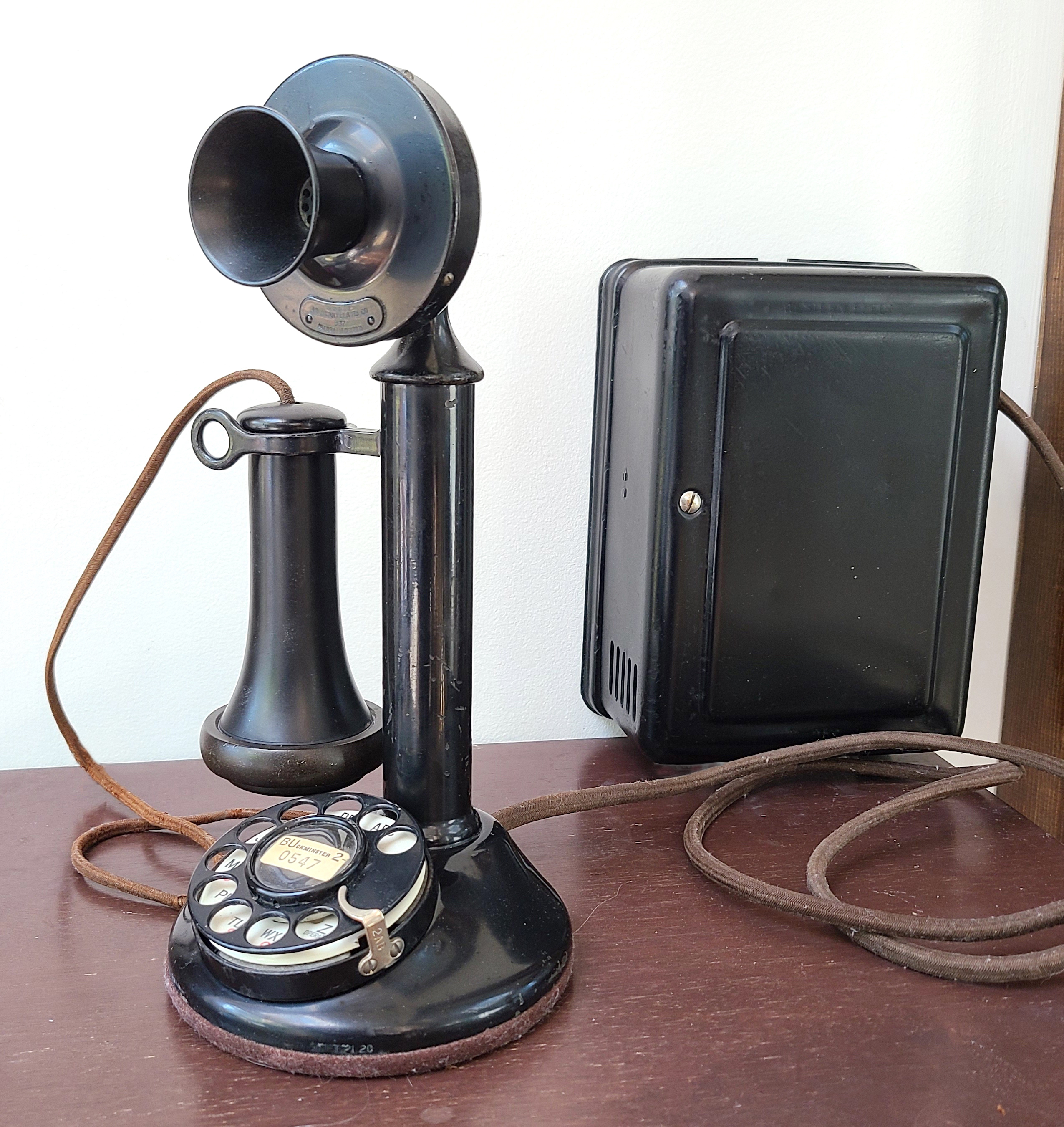
A Western Electric desk stand telephone of the 1920s and 30s.

The candlestick telephone (or pole telephone) is a style of telephone that was common from the late 1890s to the 1940s. A candlestick telephone is also often referred to as a desk stand, an upright, a stick phone or in British English a pillar or pedestal telephone. Candlestick telephones featured a mouthpiece (transmitter) mounted at the top of the stand, and a receiver (earphone) that was held by the user to the ear during a call. When the telephone was not in use, the receiver rested in the fork of the switch hook protruding to the side of the stand, thereby disconnecting the audio circuit from the telephone network.

== Design and features ==
Candlestick telephones were designed with varying features. Most recognizable, candlesticks featured a base with a vertical cylindrical neck extending upright for up to 10 inches (25 cm) in length. At the top of the stand was mounted a carbon microphone (transmitter) to speak into, and a switch hook extending sideways upon which an earpiece (receiver) was hung. To make or answer a telephone call, the user lifted the receiver off the switch hook, activating an internal switch connecting the telephone to the telephone line. Candlestick telephones required the nearby installation of a subscriber set (subset, ringer box), which housed the ringer to announce incoming calls and the electric circuitry (capacitor, induction coil, signaling generator, connection terminals) to connect the set to the telephone network. When automatic telephone exchanges were introduced, the base of a candlestick also featured a rotary dial, used for signaling the telephone number of the call recipient.

== Production ==
Candlestick telephone models were produced by many manufacturers. In the United States, the main producers of these telephones were Western Electric (a unit of AT&T), Automatic Electric Co. (later acquired by GTE), Kellogg Switchboard & Supply Company and Stromberg-Carlson. The first tube shaft candlestick telephone was the Western Electric #20B Desk Phone patented in 1904. In the 1920s and 1930s, telephone technology shifted to the design of more efficient desktop telephones that featured a handset with receiver and transmitter elements in one unit, making the use of a telephone more convenient. Despite ceasing new production, many candlestick telephones remained in operation, maintained by the telephone companies in the 1940s and into the 1950s. Many retro-style versions of the candlestick telephone were made, long after the original phones were obsolete, by companies such as Radio Shack and the Crosley Radio company.

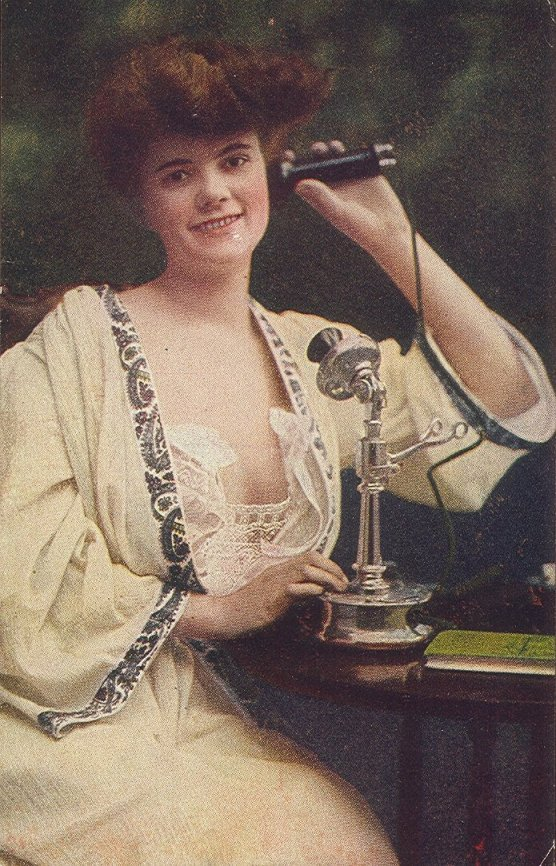
An early 20th-century candlestick telephone in use

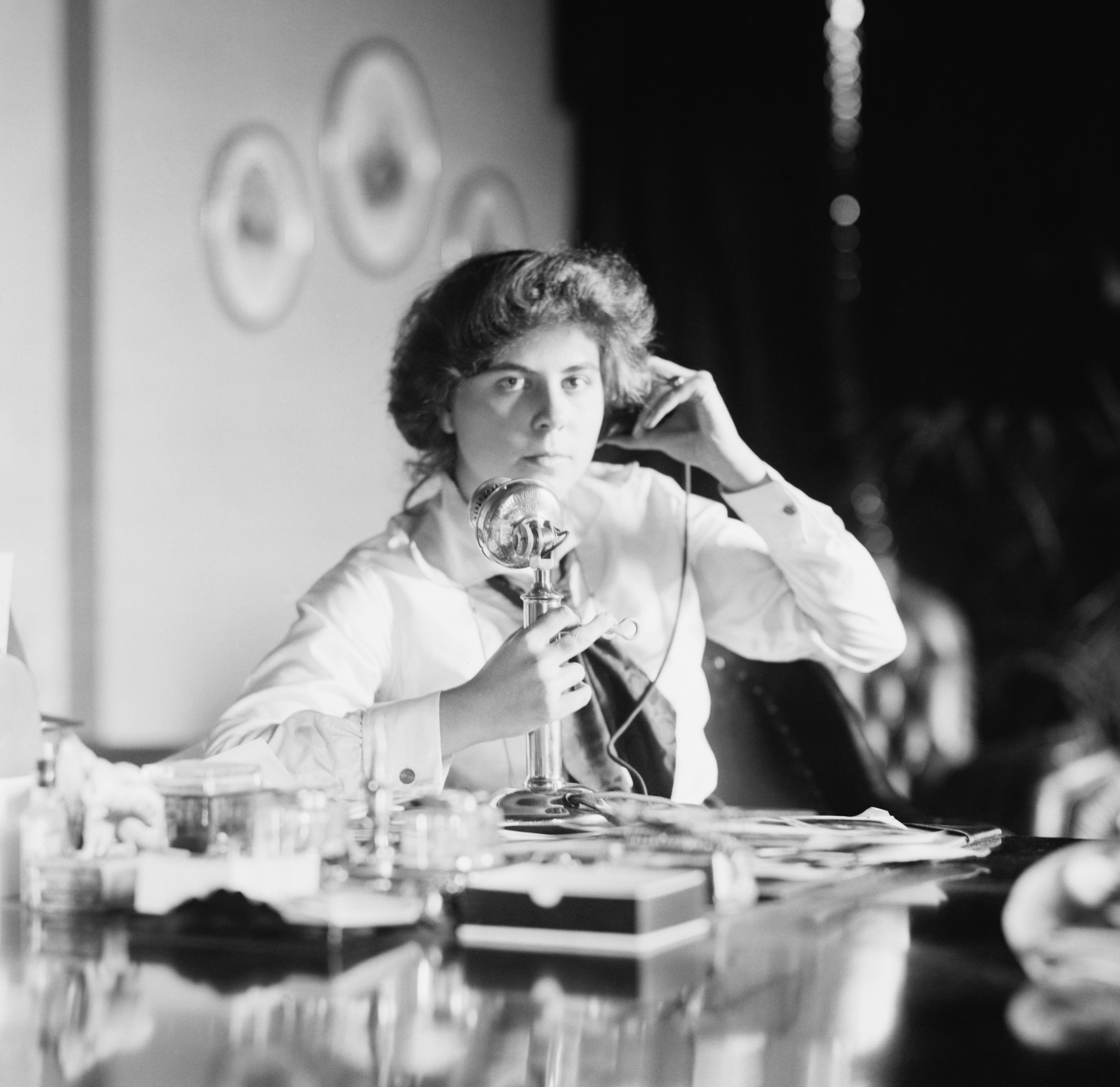
An American candlestick telephone being used by Genevieve Clark Thomson, circa 1915.

== Successor telephones ==
When Western Electric had sufficiently developed modern handset design in the 1920s, the Western Electric candlesticks were superseded by a series of new desktop models of hand telephone sets, starting with the Type A handset mounting in 1927. This was essentially a candlestick telephone that had its vertical tube-shaft shortened to about 1 1/2 inches (4 cm) in height above the round base, and had a cradle on top of it, designed to hold a combined handset with both the receiver and the transmitter in the same unit. The cradle contained a plunger that operated the hook switch in the base below. The A1 was only distributed for a short time until the B-type telephone mount was completed the same year, a streamlined design that replaced the tube shaft with a sculpted cone shape. By 1930 this round base was redesigned into the elliptical-footprint D handset mounting to avoid instability of the unit when dialing. In the same period, the electric circuitry was upgraded to produce the model 202 telephone, which reduced the strong sidetone characteristic of earlier designs.

== Accessories ==
The Hush-A-Phone was an accessory for candlestick telephones, similar in appearance to a miniature megaphone, created in 1920 for slipping over the candlestick phone. It was intended to reduce noise pollution and increase privacy during calls.
