= Bell System Practices =

Technical documentation series

A typical volume of Bell System Practices from the 1970s.

The Bell System Practices (BSPs) is a compilation of technical publications which describes the best methods of engineering, constructing, installing, and maintaining the telephone plant of the Bell System under direction of AT&T and Bell Telephone Laboratories. Covering everything from accounting and human resources procedures through complete technical descriptions of every product serviced by the Bell System, it includes a level of detail specific to the best way to wrap a wire around a screw, for example.

With sections regularly updated, printed and distributed, the BSPs were the key to the standardized service quality throughout the Bell System. They enabled employees, who had never met previously, to easily work with one another in the event of a service outage, a disaster, or merely when relocating. Updates cover manufacturing changes phased into production during a product's lifetime of interest to the installer, including changed product features, internal component parts, available colors and installation procedures. Collectors also use these documents to help date and restore vintage telephones.

== Document organization ==
Issuance of Bell System Practices within the Bell System started in the late 1920s, when they replaced a similar compendium, the AT&T Handbook Specifications. Initially, BSPs were identified by mixed alphanumeric sequence numbers designating a section and a specific document number within each section. The sections consisted of one letter and two digits, followed by a period character and a three-digit document number. The version of each document was indicated by an issue number. For example, the section designation C34.175 Issue 1 identified a document entitled Station Dials—2 and 4 Types—Maintenance.

In the 1950s, the format of BSP designations was changed to a nine-digit numerical format, written in three groups of three digits. The first three digits referred to the division, which indicated a broad subject area, such as subscriber sets or the No. 1 ESS. The next three digits indicated a specific subject area, such as the specific type of equipment used within the major division subject. The final three digits indicate the serial number of the document. The content could be general descriptive information, information on wiring and connections, test procedures, or piece-part replacement and repair information.

The BSP documents were produced in primarily two formats, 8 1/2"x11" pages for use in office environments, and in a small, portable format (4" x 6 7/8") for use by installers on the job, carried in their service trucks. Starting in the 1970s the most frequently used BSPs were bundled in convenient handbooks each covering general subject matters, such as the Station Service Manual.

The 9-digit format and numbering system was also used by Nortel and ITT Corporation due to their provenance from the Bell System's manufacturing unit, Western Electric.

== Changes after divestiture ==
After the Bell System divestiture of 1984, AT&T maintained the basic organization and maintenance of the publication under the revised name AT&T Practices, but the publication was later divided among the new companies created by divestiture. Specifically, the AT&T Practices covered most equipment topics that stayed with Bell Labs, which acquired the name AT&T. Bellcore Recommendation covered network maintenance and design topics transferred to Bellcore. Bell Service Practices (and variations) referred to the plant and technical reference maintained by the various Regional Bell Operating Companies. Lucent Technology Practices, and other publications contained product lines taken over by the respective manufacturers. Avaya and Alcatel-Lucent still publish practices using the 9-digit section numbering format.

== BSP nine-digit numerical index ==
Section	Reference	Description
GENERAL INFORMATION	000-000-000	General Information - Bell System Practices
GENERAL INFORMATION	000-000-001	Master Alphabetical Index - All Divisions
GENERAL INFORMATION	000-000-005	Master Numerical Index - All Divisions
GENERAL INFORMATION	000-000-006	Index of Maintenance Practices Available in Handbook Size
GENERAL INFORMATION	000-000-007	Master Alphabetical Index—Task Oriented Practices
GENERAL INFORMATION	001-000-000	(Reserved for company-issued administrative practices. The Number assignments are to be made locally.)
GENERAL INFORMATION	002-000-000	(Reserved for company-issued administrative practices. The Number assignments are to be made locally.)
GENERAL INFORMATION	003-000-000	(Reserved for company-issued administrative practices. The Number assignments are to be made locally.)
GENERAL INFORMATION	004-000-000	(Reserved for company-issued administrative practices. The Number assignments are to be made locally.)
GENERAL INFORMATION	005-000-000	Abbreviations, Definitions, Drawings, Requirement Tables, Specifications, and Symbols
GENERAL INFORMATION	006-000-000	Microfilm Systems
GENERAL INFORMATION	007-000-000	Information Systems
GENERAL INFORMATION	010-000-000	General Methods
COMMON	020-000-000	General Information- Divisions 020 to 178 Inclusive
APPARATUS	024-000-000	Amplifiers, Controllers, Control Units, Regulators, and Electron Tubes
APPARATUS	026-000-000	Banks, Clutches, Commutators and Commutator Brushes, Elevator Apparatus, Multiple Brushes and Rods, and Trip Rods for Panel Offices - Circuit Breakers, Compensators, Connectors, Control Panels, Fuses and Mountings, Magnetic Switches, Selectors, and Starters
APPARATUS	028-000-000	Autotransformers, Bells, Buzzers, Dials, Dial Adapters and Mountings, Gongs, Head Telephone Sets, Headsets, Potentiometers, Rheostats, Ringers, and Sounders
APPARATUS	030-000-000	Calculogrophs, Call Timing Switch, Cameras, Clocks, Counters, Photo Processors, Registers, Selector Multiple Designation Cards, Switches, Tape Printers, Ticketers, Timers, and Time Stamp
APPARATUS	032-000-000	Capacitors, Connectors, Cords, Cord Reels, Diodes, Drops, Jacks, Keys, lamps, Plugs, Resistors, Signals, Sockets, Thermistors, Transistors, and Varistors
APPARATUS	034-000-000	Distributors, Regenerators, and Regenerative Repeaters for Teletypewriter Service - AMA Tope Reels and Reeler, Cleaning Cabinet, Perforators, Readers, Recorders, Recorder Reproducers, Tape Announcing Machine, and Translators
APPARATUS	040-000-000	Relays
MISCELLANEOUS EQUIPMENT, MATERIALS, CIRCUITS, AND METHODS	065-000-000	Miscellaneous Equipment and Materials
MISCELLANEOUS EQUIPMENT, MATERIALS, CIRCUITS, AND METHODS	067-000-000	Concentrators
MISCELLANEOUS EQUIPMENT, MATERIALS, CIRCUITS, AND METHODS	069-000-000	Miscellaneous Methods
TOOLS AND GAUGES	074-000-000	Catalogue Information- Tools
TOOLS AND GAUGES	074-000-000	Index of Tools - Switching System and Power
TOOLS AND GAUGES	075-000-000	Tools and Materials (Common Usage)- Maintenance, Selection, and Use
TOOLS AND GAUGES	076-000-000	Tools and Materials - Switching Systems and Power - Maintenance, Selection, and Use
TOOLS AND GAUGES	080-000-000	Tools and Materials- Customer Equipment
TOOLS AND GAUGES	081-000-000	Tools and Materials - Outside Plant
TOOLS AND GAUGES	084-000-000	Catalogue Information - Gauges - Electrical Indicating Instruments and Meters
TOOLS AND GAUGES	084-000-000	Alphabetical Index - Gauges - Description
TOOLS AND GAUGES	085-000-000	Gouges !Common Usage! - Maintenance, Selection, and Use
TEST EQUIPMENT	100-000-000	Test Equipment, Electrical Indicating Instruments and Meters (Common Usage) - Maintenance, Selection, and Use
TEST EQUIPMENT	102-000-000	Test Equipment, Electrical Indicating Instruments and Meters !Switching Systems and Pawed - Maintenance, Selection, and Use
TEST EQUIPMENT	103-000-000	Transmission Test Equipment
TEST EQUIPMENT	104-000-000	Radio Test Equipment
TEST EQUIPMENT	105-000-000	PBX and Station Test Equipment
TEST EQUIPMENT	106-000-000	Outside Plant Electrical Test Equipment
TEST EQUIPMENT	107-000-000	Data and Teletypewriter Test Equipment
POWER	155-000-000	Alternators, Engine-Alternators, Gas Turbine Alternators, Tone Alternators, Tone Machines, Ringing and Coin Control Generators, Charging Generators and Motor-Generators
POWER	157-000-000	Batteries
POWER	159-000-000	Engines and Engine Sets, Motors, Dynamotors, and Drives
POWER	161-000-000	Speed Reduction Units, Converters, Inverters, Air Dryers, Compressors, Compressor Dehydrators, Dehydrators, Exhauster Sets, Fans, Tube Cooling Systems, Ventilating Equipment, Call Announcer Machines, and Waveguides
POWER	163-000-000	Interrupters, Ringing Machines, and Pole Changers
POWER	167-000-000	Power Plants, Power Units, and Power Supply
POWER	169-000-000	Rectifiers and Filament Supplies
POWER	171-000-000	Miscellaneous Power Circuits and Equipment
SIGNALING EQUIPMENT	179-000-000	Signaling Circuits and Associated Ringer Circuits
OPERATIONS SUPPORT SYSTEMS	190-000-000	Operations Centers and Support Systems - Operations, Maintenance, and Administration
SWITCHING SYSTEMS	201-000-000	Supplemental Information - Central Offices
SWITCHING SYSTEMS	201-000-005	Alphabetical Index for Division 201
SWITCHING SYSTEMS	205-000-000	Automatic Data Test Circuits
SWITCHING SYSTEMS	210-000-000	Service Observing, and Plant and Traffic Desks
SWITCHING SYSTEMS	211-000-000	No. 1, 3, 5, and 6 Toll Offices; No. 1, 3, 5, and 6 Toil Switchboards; and No. 6A Teletypewriter Switchboard
SWITCHING SYSTEMS	212-000-000	No. 4A and 4M Toil Switching Systems
SWITCHING SYSTEMS	215-000-000	Panel Offices
SWITCHING SYSTEMS	216-000-000	No. 1 Crossbar Offices
SWITCHING SYSTEMS	218-000-000	No. 3, No. 5, and No. 5A Crossbar Offices
SWITCHING SYSTEMS	218-000-001	Alphabetical index.- No. 5 Crossbar
SWITCHING SYSTEMS	218-000-002	Alphabetical Index - No. 5A Crossbar
SWITCHING SYSTEMS	218-000-003	Alphabetical Index - No. 3 Crossbar
SWITCHING SYSTEMS	218-779-000	Alphabetical Index - No. 5 Crossbar Offices - Arranged With Call Data Transmitter
SWITCHING SYSTEMS	218-799-000	Alphabetical Index - No. 5 Crossbar Offices - Arranged With Electronic Translation System
SWITCHING SYSTEMS	220-000-000	Crossbar Tandem Offices
SWITCHING SYSTEMS	225-000-000	Testing Information Applying to Specific Step-byStep and Community Dial Offices
SWITCHING SYSTEMS	226-000-000	Equipment Common to More Than One Type Step-by-Step and Community Dial Office
SWITCHING SYSTEMS	226-000-005	Alphabetical Index - Step-by-Step and Community Dial Offices
SWITCHING SYSTEMS	227-000-000	General and Testing Information Applying to Intertoll Dialing, CAMA, AMA, ANI, "TOUCH-TONE®" Calling and Common Control Equipment - Step-by-Step Systems
SWITCHING SYSTEMS	230-000-000	Data Network Systems
SWITCHING SYSTEMS	230-100-006	Transaction Network - Reference and Supplemental Information
SWITCHING SYSTEMS	231-000-000	No. 1 and No. 1A Electronic Switching Systems (ESS)
SWITCHING SYSTEMS	231-000-001	Alphabetical Index of 231 Division Section Titles—No. 1 and. No. 1A Electronic Switching Systems
SWITCHING SYSTEMS	232-000-000	No. 2 Electronic Switching System (ESS)
SWITCHING SYSTEMS	233-000-000	No. 3 Electronic Switching System (ESS)
SWITCHING SYSTEMS	233-000-010	Interdivisional Numerical Index - Excluding Division 233 - No. 3 Electronic Switching System
SWITCHING SYSTEMS	234-000-000	No. 4 Electronic Switching System (ESS)
SWITCHING SYSTEMS	234-000-005	Interdivisional Numerical Index - No. 4 Electronic Switching System
SWITCHING SYSTEMS	235-000-000	No. 5 Electronic Switching. System (ESS)
SWITCHING SYSTEMS	240-000-000	No. 1 0 1 Electronic Switching System (ESS)
SWITCHING SYSTEMS	241-000-000	General Trade Switching Systems
SWITCHING SYSTEMS	250-000-000	Traffic Service Systems
SWITCHING SYSTEMS	252-000-000	Traffic Management Systems
SWITCHING SYSTEMS	254-000-000	Stored Program Control
SWITCHING SYSTEMS	255-000-000	Processor Controlled Ancillary Systems
SWITCHING SYSTEMS	250-000-010	Interdivisional Numerical Index - No. 1 A Voice Storage System
SWITCHING SYSTEMS	256-000-000	Common Channel Signaling System (CCSS)
TRANSMISSION AND SIGNALING SYSTEMS AND TESTING	300-000-000	Transmission Systems and Testing - Cross Reference lists
TRANSMISSION AND SIGNALING SYSTEMS AND TESTING	301-000-000	Transmission Performance Measurement Plans
TRANSMISSION AND SIGNALING SYSTEMS AND TESTING	302-000-000	Transmission Test Line Directories
TRANSMISSION AND SIGNALING SYSTEMS AND TESTING	304-000-000	Transmission Data
TRANSMISSION AND SIGNALING SYSTEMS AND TESTING	309-000-000	Switched Services Networks
TRANSMISSION AND SIGNALING SYSTEMS AND TESTING	310-000-000	Nonswitched Special Services System
TRANSMISSION AND SIGNALING SYSTEMS AND TESTING	311-000-000	Switched Special Services Systems
TRANSMISSION AND SIGNALING SYSTEMS AND TESTING	312-000-000	Private Line Data Systems and Services
TRANSMISSION AND SIGNALING SYSTEMS AND TESTING	314-000-000	Digital and Analogue Data Transmission Systems
TRANSMISSION AND SIGNALING SYSTEMS AND TESTING	318-000-000	Television Systems
TRANSMISSION AND SIGNALING SYSTEMS AND TESTING	320-000-000	Program Transmission Systems and Services
TRANSMISSION AND SIGNALING SYSTEMS AND TESTING	330-000-000	Cable and Open-Wire Testing and Trouble location Methods
TRANSMISSION AND SIGNALING SYSTEMS AND TESTING	331-000-000	Transmission Noise Testing, Central Office PBX Customer lines and Equipment
TRANSMISSION AND SIGNALING SYSTEMS AND TESTING	332-000-000	Voice-frequency Telephone Repeaters, Pilot Wire Regulators, Echo Suppressors, Composite Sets and Associated Equipment
TRANSMISSION AND SIGNALING SYSTEMS AND TESTING	333-000-000	Interoffice Signaling Systems and Testing
TRANSMISSION AND SIGNALING SYSTEMS AND TESTING	340-000-000	PICTUREPHONE® Services - Baseband Video Transmission
TRANSMISSION AND SIGNALING SYSTEMS AND TESTING	341-000-000	PICTUREPHONE® Transmission - Performance Plan
TRANSMISSION AND SIGNALING SYSTEMS AND TESTING	354-000-000	Frequency Generating Systems
TRANSMISSION AND SIGNALING SYSTEMS AND TESTING	355-000-000	Type K Carrier Telephone Systems and Associated Equipment Components
TRANSMISSION AND SIGNALING SYSTEMS AND TESTING	356-000-000	Analog Multiplex Terminal Equipment
TRANSMISSION AND SIGNALING SYSTEMS AND TESTING	357-000-000	Wire-Line Entrance Links and Broadband Entrance Links and Interconnection
TRANSMISSION AND SIGNALING SYSTEMS AND TESTING	358-000-000	Type L1 Carrier Telephone System and Associated Equipment Components
TRANSMISSION AND SIGNALING SYSTEMS AND TESTING	359-000-000	L3, L4, L4S, L5, and LSE Carrier
TRANSMISSION AND SIGNALING SYSTEMS AND TESTING	360-000-000	Maintenance Center Tests - Equipment Components- Type L1 and L3 Carrier Telephone Systems
TRANSMISSION AND SIGNALING SYSTEMS AND TESTING	361-000-000	Service Center Tests - type N, 0, and ON Carrier Systems
TRANSMISSION AND SIGNALING SYSTEMS AND TESTING	362-000-000	Type N, 0, and ON Carrier Telephone Systems and Associated Equipment Components
TRANSMISSION AND SIGNALING SYSTEMS AND TESTING	363-000-000	Pair Gain Systems
TRANSMISSION AND SIGNALING SYSTEMS AND TESTING	364-000-000	Submarine Cable Systems !long lines Only!
TRANSMISSION AND SIGNALING SYSTEMS AND TESTING	365-000-000	Digital Transmission Systems
TRANSMISSION AND SIGNALING SYSTEMS AND TESTING	370-000-000	TA SI (long Lines Only)
TRANSMISSION AND SIGNALING SYSTEMS AND TESTING	371-000-000	Broadband Restoration
RADIO	400-000-000	Radio Administration
RADIO	402-000-000	Antennas, Transmission lines, and Waveguide
RADIO	403-000-000	Coastal Harbor, High Seas, Overseas, and Emergency Point-to-Point Radio
RADIO	404-000-000	Manual Mobile Radio
RADIO	405-000-000	NJ, MKS, and ML Mobile Radiotelephone
RADIO	406-000-000	Air-Ground Radio
RADIO	407-000-000	Personal Radio Services
RADIO	408-000-000	Motorola, RCA, Federal, REL, Narrow band Auxiliary Channel and Other Non-Western Electric Microwave Radio, and TV Off-the-Air Pick-Up Services
RADIO	409-000-000	TE, DT, Tl, and TM Microwave Radio
RADIO	410-000-000	TD-2 Microwave Radio
RADIO	411-000-000	TD-3 Microwave Radio
RADIO	412-000-000	TH-1 Microwave Radio
RADIO	413-000-000	TH-3 Microwave Radio
RADIO	415-000-000	TD-3 Microwave Radio
RADIO	416-000-000	TN-1 Microwave Radio
RADIO	417-000-000	3A-Radio Digital Systems
RADIO	419-000-000	Single Sideband Microwave Radio Systems
RADIO	420-000-000	Microwave Radio - Common Equipment
RADIO	421-000-000	FR/DR Microwave Radio System
RADIO	422-000-000	Common Microwave Radio- Transmission Systems
CUSTOMER EQUIPMENT	460-000-000	General Information
CUSTOMER EQUIPMENT	460-000-006	Alphabetic-Numeric Index - Station, Key, PBX, and Private Service Systems
CUSTOMER EQUIPMENT	461-000-000	Wiring and Cabling
CUSTOMER EQUIPMENT	462-000-000	Drop and Block Wiring and Dedicated Plant
CUSTOMER EQUIPMENT	463-000-000	Miscellaneous Station Apparatus for Use With Station Installations
SPECIAL SERVICES	471-000-000	Other Common Carriers
SPECIAL SERVICES	473-000-000	Intro-PBX Protection of Service, Code Calling, Customer Training, Dispatching, Emergency Reporting, Interface Trunks, Message Waiting, Recorded Telephone Dictation, Telephone Answering Systems, and Transmitter Transfer
SPECIAL SERVICES	475-000-000	Call Distributing System No. IS, Information Desks, and Order Turrets
SPECIAL SERVICES	476-000-000	Force Administration Data System (FADS)- Automatic Call Distributing System (ACD), No. 2A, 28, and 3A and Call Distributing System No. 4A
SPECIAL SERVICES	480-000-000	Private Service Systems
SPECIAL SERVICES	481-000-000	Teleconferencing Service
STATION EQUIPMENT	500-000-000	General Considerations for Station Installations
STATION EQUIPMENT	501-000-000	Station Set Components
STATION EQUIPMENT	502-000-000	Common Battery Station Sets
STATION EQUIPMENT	503-000-000	Modular Station Sets - Common Battery
STATION EQUIPMENT	504-000-000	Selector Consoles, Telephone Consoles, and Apparatus Units
STATION EQUIPMENT	506-000-000	Public telephone Sets
STATION EQUIPMENT	508-000-000	Public Telephone Enclosures and Miscellaneous Accessories
STATION EQUIPMENT	510-000-000	Station Sets and Coin Collectors—local Battery and Magneto
STATION EQUIPMENT	512-000-000	Automatic Dialers, Station Keys, Key Equipment, Interphone Systems, Modular Units, and Speakerphone Systems
STATION EQUIPMENT	514-000-000	Telephone Answering and Announcement Sets and Systems
STATION EQUIPMENT	518-000-000	Key Telephone Systems, Video Telephone Stations, and Switching Systems
STATION EQUIPMENT	518-451-110	HORIZON® Communications System - Feature Document Cross-Reference Guide
STATION EQUIPMENT	529-000-000	Station Apparatus and Equipment Intended Solely for Specially-..engineered lines - Not for General Telephone Use
PRIVATE BRANCH EXCHANGES	533-000-000	Customer Premises Systems (ESS Provided Customer Services)
PRIVATE BRANCH EXCHANGES	533-000-001	Interdivisional Alphanumeric Indexes - ESS Provided Services -Customer Premises Systems
PRIVATE BRANCH EXCHANGES	534-000-000	Sections Applying to More Than One PBX Series - 500, 600, 700, and 800 Series- Manual and Dial PBX
PRIVATE BRANCH EXCHANGES	536-000-000	500 Series PBX
PRIVATE BRANCH EXCHANGES	538-000-000	600 Series PBX
PRIVATE BRANCH EXCHANGES	540-000-000	Sections Applying to More Than One 700 Series PBX Including Centrex CU, Attendant Equipment for Centrex CO, and "TOUCH-TONE®" Calling
PRIVATE BRANCH EXCHANGES	541-000-000	700C and 710C PBX
PRIVATE BRANCH EXCHANGES	542-000-000	701- and 711-Type PBX
PRIVATE BRANCH EXCHANGES	543-000-000	702A PBX
PRIVATE BRANCH EXCHANGES	546-000-000	740-Type PBX
PRIVATE BRANCH EXCHANGES	548-000-000	750A PBX
PRIVATE BRANCH EXCHANGES	550-000-000	755A PBX
PRIVATE BRANCH EXCHANGES	551-000-000	756A, 757A, 758A, 758B, 758C, 761, and 770 PBX
PRIVATE BRANCH EXCHANGES	553-000-000	800 Series PBX
PRIVATE BRANCH EXCHANGES	554-000-000	"DIMENSION®" PBX
PRIVATE BRANCH EXCHANGES	554-191-100	"DIMENSION®" PBX- Feature Document Reference Guide
TELETYPEWRITER AND OTHER DATA TERMINALS	570-000-000	Teletypewriter General Information - Miscellaneous Apparatus and Auxiliary' Equipment
TELETYPEWRITER AND OTHER DATA TERMINALS	570-000-003	Master Cross-Reference Index of Port Numbers and Associated 9-digit Sections
TELETYPEWRITER AND OTHER DATA TERMINALS	572-000-000	14- 15-, 19-, and 20-Type Teletypewriters
TELETYPEWRITER AND OTHER DATA TERMINALS	573-000-000	28- Type Teletypewriters
TELETYPEWRITER AND OTHER DATA TERMINALS	574-000-000	Teletypewriter 30 Series and Teleprinters
TELETYPEWRITER AND OTHER DATA TERMINALS	578-000-000	Miscellaneous Data Terminals
TELETYPEWRITER AND OTHER DATA TERMINALS	579-000-000	Teletypewriter Field Maintenance Practices/Field Installation Maintenance Practices
TELETYPEWRITER AND OTHER DATA TERMINALS	580-000-000	Teletypewriter Switching Systems
TELETYPEWRITER AND OTHER DATA TERMINALS	581-000-000	Teletypewriter Selective Calling Systems
TELETYPEWRITER AND OTHER DATA TERMINALS	582-000-000	DATASPEED® Services- Systems, Services and Components
DATA SYSTEMS	590-000-000	General Information
DATA SYSTEMS	591-000-000	1 00 Series Data Sets and Associated Services
DATA SYSTEMS	592-000-000	200 Series Data Sets and Associated Services
DATA SYSTEMS	593-000-000	300 Series Data Sets and Associated Services
DATA SYSTEMS	594-000-000	400 Series Data Sets and Associated Services
DATA SYSTEMS	595-000-000	500-Type Service Units and Sets for Digital Systems/Services
DATA SYSTEMS	596-000-000	600 Series Data Sets and Associated Services
DATA SYSTEMS	598-000-000	800 Series Auxiliary Equipments
OUTSIDE PLANT	620-000-000	General
OUTSIDE PLANT	620-000-005	Outside Plant - Construction and Maintenance - Permuted Alphabetical Index
OUTSIDE PLANT	621-000-000	Pole Lines
OUTSIDE PLANT	622-000-000	Conduit, Manholes, and Cable Ducts
OUTSIDE PLANT	623-000-000	Open Wire
OUTSIDE PLANT	624-000-000	Multiple Wire
OUTSIDE PLANT	626-000-000	Cables, Wire, and Apparatus - General
OUTSIDE PLANT	627-000-000	Aerial, Block, and House Cable
OUTSIDE PLANT	628-000-000	Underground Cable
OUTSIDE PLANT	629-000-000	Buried Plant
OUTSIDE PLANT	630-000-000	Submarine Cable
OUTSIDE PLANT	631-000-000	Cable Terminals
OUTSIDE PLANT	632-000-000	Cable Splicing
OUTSIDE PLANT	633-000-000	Splice Closures
OUTSIDE PLANT	634-000-000	Electrical Cable Testing and Identification
OUTSIDE PLANT	635-000-000	Electrolysis - Outside Plant
OUTSIDE PLANT	636-000-000	Main Frame Terminations and Connectors
OUTSIDE PLANT	637-000-000	Cable Pressure Systems
OUTSIDE PLANT	637-600-011	Expanded Cable Pressure Monitoring System (CMPS)
OUTSIDE PLANT	638-000-000	Electrical Protection and Bonding
OUTSIDE PLANT	639-000-000	Concentrators - Outside Plant
OUTSIDE PLANT	640-000-000	Outside Plant - Carrier Apparatus
OUTSIDE PLANT	643-000-000	Coil and Capacitor Cases and Apparatus Cases for Inductors and Filters
OUTSIDE PLANT	644-000-000	Upkeep
OUTSIDE PLANT	649-000-000	Construction Equipment - Outside Plant (also see Divisions 010, 075, 081, 106, and 157)
TEST CENTER OPERATION	660-000-000	Test Center Operation
TEST CENTER OPERATION	660-000-005	Alphabetical Index- Test Center Operation (Divisions 660 Through 669)
TEST CENTER OPERATION	660-168-010	Automated Repair Service Bureau - Documentation Index
TEST CENTER OPERATION	662-000-000	Cable and Local Test Desks and Local Test Cabinets
TEST CENTER OPERATION	664-000-000	Test boards for Other Than Special Services
TEST CENTER OPERATION	666-000-000	Testboords and Test Positions for Special Services
TEST CENTER OPERATION	667-000-000	Switched Maintenance Access Systems (SMAS)
TEST CENTER OPERATION	668-000-000	Data Test Centers
LOOP ASSIGNMENT	680-000-000	Loop Assignment - Distribution Service
LOOP ASSIGNMENT	680-000-005	Alphabetical Index - Plant Assignment - Divisions 680 through 689
LOOP ASSIGNMENT	680-400-010	Index - Telephone Set field Inventory Control
LOOP ASSIGNMENT	682-000-000	Trunk Plant and Special Services
MOTOR VEHICLES	720-000-000	Motor Vehicles and Construction Apparatus
MATERIALS MANAGEMENT	740-000-000	General Information
MATERIALS MANAGEMENT	740-000-001	Overall Supplies - Divisions · 740 through 749
MATERIALS MANAGEMENT	740-000-002	Materials Management Operations Safety Procedure References
MATERIALS MANAGEMENT	741-000-000	Supporting Functions
MATERIALS MANAGEMENT	742-000-000	Supply Controls
MATERIALS MANAGEMENT	743-000-000	Supply Ordering and Computer Controls
MATERIALS MANAGEMENT	744-000-000	Supply Distribution
MATERIALS MANAGEMENT	745-000-000	Material Returns
MATERIALS MANAGEMENT	746-000-000	Supply Functions - Miscellaneous
MATERIALS MANAGEMENT	747-000-000	Plug-In Equipment- Central Office and Customer Premises Switching
BUSINESS INFORMATION SYSTEMS	750-000-000	BISP General
BUSINESS INFORMATION SYSTEMS	751-000-000	Common language
BUSINESS INFORMATION SYSTEMS	756-000-000	Trunks and Special Services
BUILDINGS	760-000-000	Building Engineering
BUILDINGS	760-000-005	Alphabetical Index- Divisions 760 and 770- Building Engineering and Building Operation
BUILDINGS	770-000-000	Building Operation
ENGINEERING PLANNING	780-000-000	Network Operations Methods
ENGINEERING PLANNING	780-000-010	Interdivisional Numerical Index - Network Administration Technical Planning
ENGINEERING PLANNING	788-000-000	Business Services Planning and Operations
ENGINEERING PLANNING	788-100-000	Cross-Reference Index- Business Services Facilities Engineering Practices (BSFEP) to Bell System Practices
ENGINEERING PLANNING	788-100-101	Recommended Document list - Business Service Traffic Engineering
ENGINEERING PLANNING	788-102-100	Cross-Reference Index- Business Services Facilities Administrative Practices (BSFAP) to Bell System Practices
ENGINEERING PLANNING	788-102-101	Recommended Document List - Business Services Traffic Administration
ENGINEERING ADMINISTRATION	790-000-000	Engineering Administrative Practices
COMMON LANGUAGE	795-000-000	Common language
COMMON LANGUAGE	795-200-006	Alphabetical Index of Basic, Codes—Common language Equipment Identification (CLE)
EQUIPMENT DESIGN AND GENERAL REQUIREMENTS	800-000-000	Cross-Reference lists, Administrative Information, General Equipment Requirements for Installation and Manufacturing, and General Performance Requirements
EQUIPMENT DESIGN AND GENERAL REQUIREMENTS	801-000-000	Common Systems
EQUIPMENT DESIGN AND GENERAL REQUIREMENTS	802-000-000	Power Systems
EQUIPMENT DESIGN AND GENERAL REQUIREMENTS	804-000-000	Toil Systems
EQUIPMENT DESIGN AND GENERAL REQUIREMENTS	806-000-000	Radio Systems and Television Systems
EQUIPMENT DESIGN AND GENERAL REQUIREMENTS	807-000-000	Data Systems
EQUIPMENT DESIGN AND GENERAL REQUIREMENTS	809-000-000	Private Branch Exchange Systems
EQUIPMENT DESIGN AND GENERAL REQUIREMENTS	811-000-000	Private Service Systems
EQUIPMENT DESIGN AND GENERAL REQUIREMENTS	812-000-000	Station Systems
EQUIPMENT DESIGN AND GENERAL REQUIREMENTS	814-000-000	Step-by-Step Systems
EQUIPMENT DESIGN AND GENERAL REQUIREMENTS	815-000-000	Panel Systems
EQUIPMENT DESIGN AND GENERAL REQUIREMENTS	816-000-000	No, I Crossbar System
EQUIPMENT DESIGN AND GENERAL REQUIREMENTS	817-000-000	Tandem Crossbar System
EQUIPMENT DESIGN AND GENERAL REQUIREMENTS	818-000-000	No. 4 Type Toil Switching System
EQUIPMENT DESIGN AND GENERAL REQUIREMENTS	819-000-000	No. 3, No. 5, and No. SA Crossbar Systems
EQUIPMENT DESIGN AND GENERAL REQUIREMENTS	820-000-000	No. 1, 1A, 2, 2A, 3 and 4 Electronic Switching Systems and No. 1A Processor
EQUIPMENT DESIGN AND GENERAL REQUIREMENTS	821-000-000	Traffic Service Systems
EQUIPMENT DESIGN AND GENERAL REQUIREMENTS	822-000-000	Traffic Management Systems
EQUIPMENT DESIGN AND GENERAL REQUIREMENTS	823-000-000	No. 101 Electronic Switching System
EQUIPMENT DESIGN AND GENERAL REQUIREMENTS	824-000-000	Operations Support Systems
EQUIPMENT DESIGN AND GENERAL REQUIREMENTS	825-000-000	Common Channel Signaling System (CCSS)
TRANSMISSION ENGINEERING	851-000-000	Special Services Systems - Engineering Design Information
TRANSMISSION ENGINEERING	852-000-000	Exchange Area and Operator Services Transmission
TRANSMISSION ENGINEERING	853-000-000	Toil Transmission
TRANSMISSION ENGINEERING	855-000-000	Carrier Engineering
TRANSMISSION ENGINEERING	856-000-000	Mechanized Transmission Engineering Tools
TRANSMISSION ENGINEERING	857-000-000	Program and Television Engineering
TRANSMISSION ENGINEERING	859-000-000	Signal Transmission - Engineering Considerations
TRANSMISSION ENGINEERING	860-000-000	PICTUREPHONE® Service Transmission Engineering
TRANSMISSION ENGINEERING	865-000-000	Transmission Maintenance Systems Engineering
TRANSMISSION ENGINEERING	870-000-000	Noise Engineering
TRANSMISSION ENGINEERING	873-000-000	Inductive Coordination
TRANSMISSION ENGINEERING	874-000-000	Supply Systems Data
TRANSMISSION ENGINEERING	876-000-000	Protection Practices
TRANSMISSION ENGINEERING	877-000-000	Corrosion Practices
TRANSMISSION ENGINEERING	880-000-000	Data Communications Engineering
OUTSIDE PLANT ENGINEERING	900-000-000	General Information
OUTSIDE PLANT ENGINEERING	900-000-100	Permuted Index - Outside Plant Engineering
OUTSIDE PLANT ENGINEERING	901-000-000	Facility Planning - Study Methods and Tools
OUTSIDE PLANT ENGINEERING	902-000-000	Facility Planning - Applied Transmission
OUTSIDE PLANT ENGINEERING	915-000-000	Facility Design - Systems
OUTSIDE PLANT ENGINEERING	916-000-000	Facility Design - Feeder Facilities
OUTSIDE PLANT ENGINEERING	917-000-000	Facility Design - Distribution Facilities
OUTSIDE PLANT ENGINEERING	918-000-000	Facility Design - Applied Protection
OUTSIDE PLANT ENGINEERING	919-000-000	Facility Design - Structure
OUTSIDE PLANT ENGINEERING	920-000-000	Facility Design - Trunk Facilities
OUTSIDE PLANT ENGINEERING	928-000-000	Facility Support - Engineering Support Functions
OUTSIDE PLANT ENGINEERING	929-000-000	Outside Plant Facility Support - Plant Operating Support functions
OUTSIDE PLANT ENGINEERING	930-000-000	Facility Support - Maintenance and Upkeep
OUTSIDE PLANT ENGINEERING	935-000-000	Management Organizing
OUTSIDE PLANT ENGINEERING	936-000-000	Management Controlling
OUTSIDE PLANT ENGINEERING	937-000-000	Management Coordinating
RADIO ENGINEERING	940-000-000	Radio Engineering
GENERAL DESCRIPTIVE INFORMATION	951-000-000	Equipment Common to More Than One Type of System
GENERAL DESCRIPTIVE INFORMATION	953-000-000	Switchboard, Desks, and Associated Equipment
GENERAL DESCRIPTIVE INFORMATION	955-000-000	Step-by-Step and Community Dial Offices
GENERAL DESCRIPTIVE INFORMATION	957-000-000	No. 1 Crossbar Offices
GENERAL DESCRIPTIVE INFORMATION	958-000-000	No. 5 Crossbar Offices
GENERAL DESCRIPTIVE INFORMATION	966-000-000	Electronic Switching Systems (ESS)
GENERAL DESCRIPTIVE INFORMATION	970-000-000	Transmission Systems
GENERAL DESCRIPTIVE INFORMATION	972-000-000	Teletypewriter and Data Systems (Information Obsolete)
GENERAL DESCRIPTIVE INFORMATION	975-000-000	Signaling Systems
GENERAL DESCRIPTIVE INFORMATION	981-000-000	Equipment on Customers' Premises Special Services and Private Branch Exchanges!
GENERAL DESCRIPTIVE INFORMATION	982-000-000	Private Service Systems
GENERAL DESCRIPTIVE INFORMATION	984-000-000	Traffic Service and Traffic Management Systems
