= Bell box =

Audible device

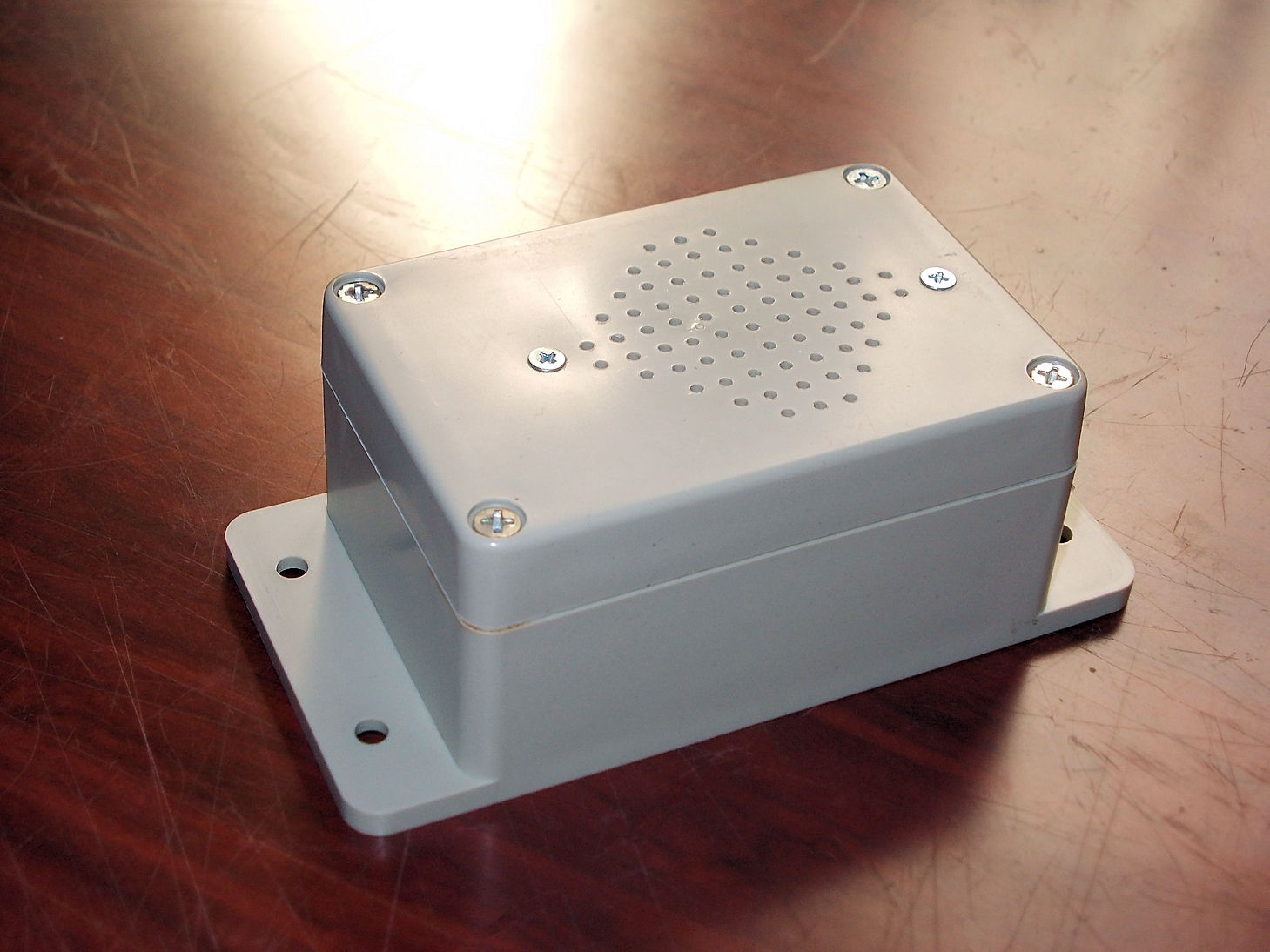
Plastic chime box

A bell box is an audible device, often electric, which when activated, emits a chime, bell, or buzzer sound.

== Components ==
The housing of the bell box may be manufactured from wood, metal, or plastic. The basic core component of a conventional bell box is an electromagnet and a bell or other metal piece, some of which create a repetitive sound. The bell sound is normally created inside the box, although the unit may have bells mounted on the outside of the box. The bell box may also include visual alerts such strobe or other flashing lights.

== Types ==
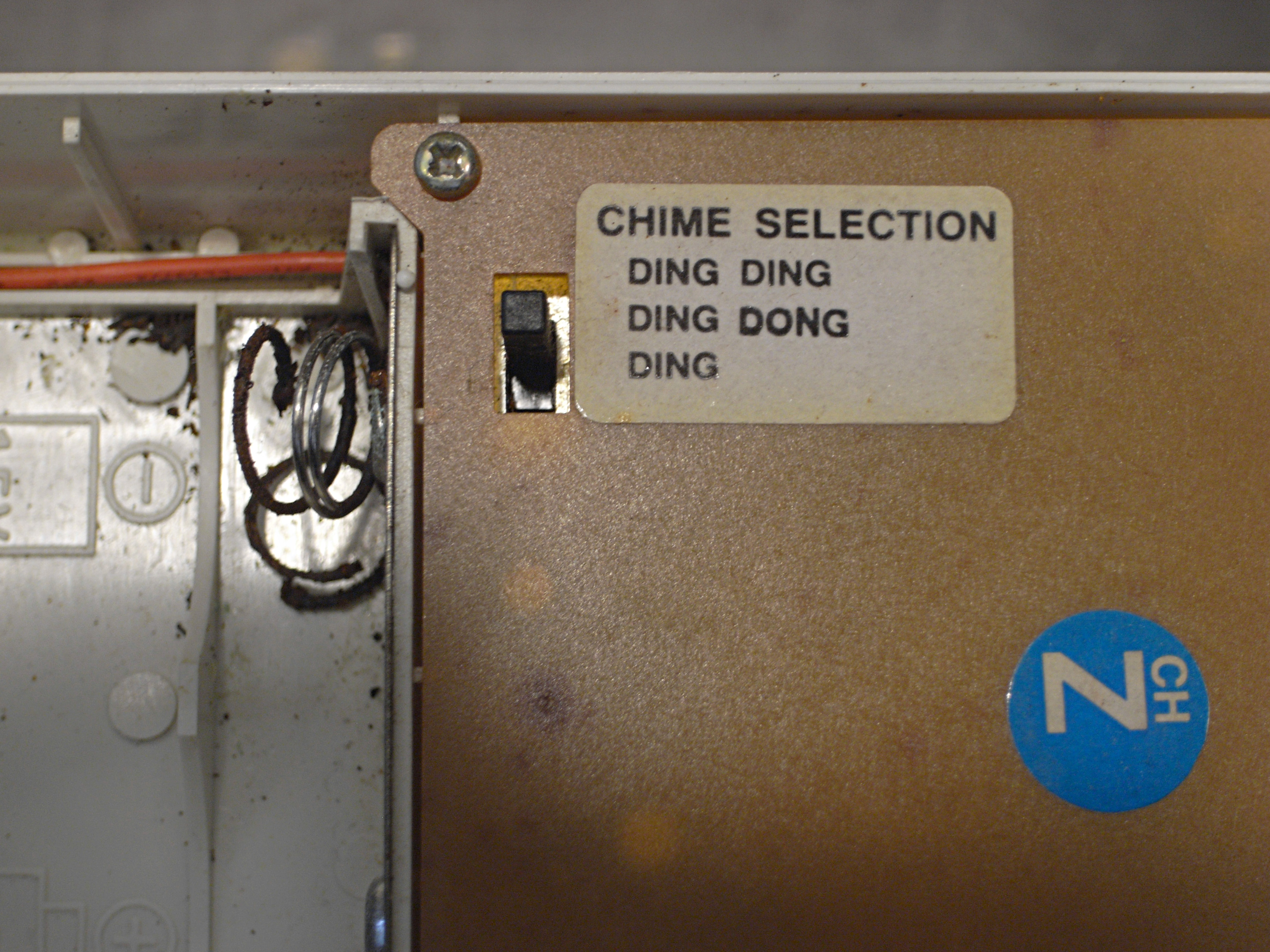
Chime settings on a bell box

A doorbell uses a bell box to signal the occupant of a home or business.

A bell box for early telephones is commonly known as a ringer box.

Other types of bell boxes include alarm clocks, burglar alarms, and smoke alarms.
