= Sidetone =

Audible feedback to the speaker using a telecommunications system

Sidetone is audible feedback to someone speaking or otherwise producing sound as an indication of active transmission. Sidetone is introduced by some communications circuits and anti-sidetone circuitry is used to control its level.

Sidetone is expected behavior for telephone systems. Absence of sidetone can cause users to believe the call has been dropped or cause them to speak loudly. Too much sidetone can cause users to speak softly.

== Telephony ==
In telephony, sidetone is the effect of sound picked up by the telephone's transmitter (mouthpiece) and instantly introduced at a low electronic signal level into the receiver (earpiece) of the same handset, a form of electrical feedback through the telephone hybrid. Sidetone in early 19th century telephones was strong due to the type of circuit used in instruments. Anti-sidetone circuitry in the telephone hybrid brought sidetone under control in the early 20th century, leaving enough feedback signal to assure the user that the telephone is working.

Almost all land-line (wired and wireless) telephones have employed sidetone, so it was an expected convention for cellular telephony, but is not standard. The amount of sidetone on land-lines is typically 8%, and is 4% for cellular phones. Usability experts believe that lack of adequate sidetone causes some people to shout or speak too loudly when using a cell phone, a behavior that is sometimes referred to as "cell yell".

One of the benefits of sidetone-enabled phones is that a user knows a call has been dropped or ended if he or she no longer hears sidetone. Comfort noise provides a similar benefit.

Sidetone is disabled when telephones are running in speakerphone mode to prevent direct acoustical feedback from the speaker to the microphone, resulting in howling. Sidetone can be, and often is, amplified for land-line phones for the hearing impaired.

== Radiotelegraphy ==
In wireless telegraphy (WT) and amateur radio, sidetone is the audible indication of a continuous wave (CW) signal as the operator sends Morse code. As in telephony, sidetone serves as feedback to the operator that what they are sending is what is intended.

It is designed to mimic the tone generated by a typical radio receiver when a CW signal is converted to the intermediate frequency (IF), then mixed with the beat frequency oscillator (BFO) frequency to generate a difference frequency, which is audible over the radio receiver loudspeaker or headphones.

Sidetone is also used on voice radio equipment to give the radio operator confidence that they are transmitting over the radio. The sidetone audio is typically derived from the transmit audio circuitry.

== Public address systems ==
When a commentator, announcer, or MC for a public event may otherwise be able to hear their own voice in the delayed output from the loudspeakers, they may opt to use a headset which provides instant sidetone of their own voice, thus removing the distracting effect of greatly delayed auditory feedback from the loudspeakers.

== See also ==
- Echo suppression and cancellation
- Stage monitor system
