= Contempra =

1967 telephone by Northern Electric

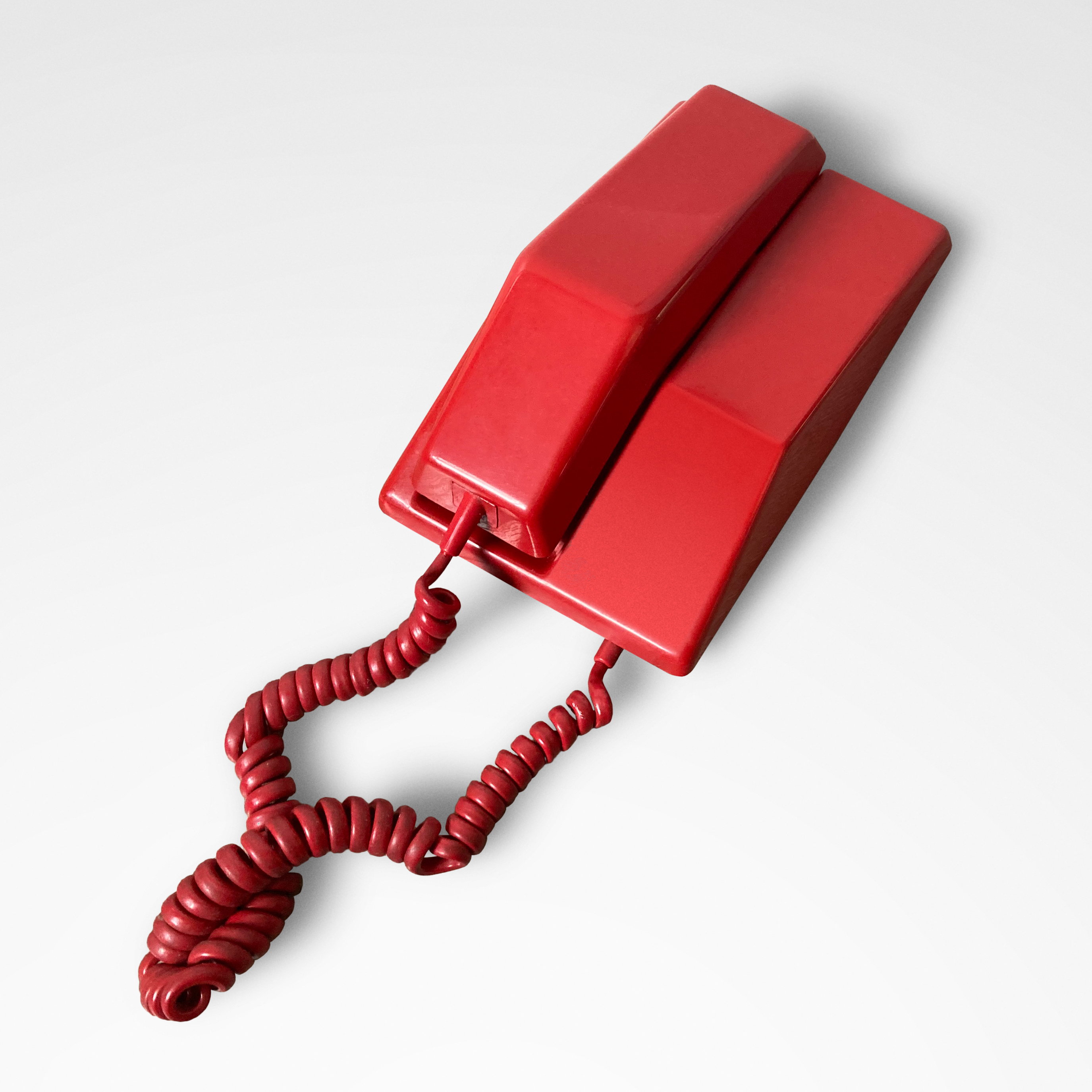
The brightly coloured Contempra was a departure from earlier Northern Electric designs, which tended to be black or beige.

The Contempra is a telephone designed and produced by Northern Electric beginning in 1967. Contempra was the first phone designed in Canada, previous Canadian sets having been designed in the US for Western Electric and built under licence.

Contempra was highly stylized, using straight lines and oblique angles where curves and corners would be found on contemporary sets like the Trimline. The design was further notable at release for being available in "nine outrageously elegant colours" including bright red and orange, deep brown and green, and other colours selected to match new styles of interior decorating emerging in the 1960s. The one option that was not initially supplied was black, the standard colour for phones for decades.

Contempra remains an icon of Canadian industrial design, famous to the point of being featured on a postage stamp. It won numerous design awards and is part of the permanent display at the Canadian Museum of History and Canada Science and Technology Museum. It was widely licensed around the world and its production, including that of a smaller version known as Contemprette, continued into the 1990s.

== History ==
Like Bell Telephone in the United States, Bell Canada held a monopoly on telephone service in Canada which encompassed every aspect of the network from the wiring to the telephone handsets. Bell Canada had its own manufacturing arm, Northern Electric (NE), which over time became partially owned by its US counterpart, Western Electric (WE). As a purely manufacturing organization, Northern Electric had no internal design department and the telephones produced in Canada were US models. This also allowed the Canadian factories to sell into the US as seasonal demand waxed and waned.

In 1949, an antitrust suit in the US forced Western Electric to sell its stake in Northern Electric; the sale was completed in 1956. The two companies arranged a ten-year licensing deal allowing NE to continue producing WE designs during that time. In 1965, as the end of the licensing deal approached, R C Scrivener, director of Bell Canada, began developing Northern Electric to become truly independent. He later said of the design process: "We could have adopted, as we have in the past, an American design. They have excellent models with many of the same features. But we thought we should produce our own."

John Tyson, a recent graduate of the Ontario College of Art (OCAD), joined Northern Electric's Carling Campus in Ottawa as their first industrial designer. A few months later he was asked to design a new phone that could be built at NE's London, Ontario, factory using as many Canadian components as possible.

At that time, Henry Dreyfuss Associates was working on a new design for Western Electric. Dreyfuss had designed all of Bell's phones since the 1940s, including the ubiquitous business-oriented Model 500 and the more modern home-oriented Princess. Their newly introduced Trimline design had several unique features, including having the rotary dial in the handset instead of the base, and compressing the size of the dial through the use of a moving finger-stop.

Tyson took Dreyfuss' advice on how to design a good product; Dreyfuss believed that if one wanted to design a successful gas pump, you should go out and pump gas. Tyson fulfilled this need by spending several weeks with telephone installers in Guelph, Ontario. This work revealed two important behaviours that led to a design significantly different from the Trimline. The first was that he found customers often had two phones, a desktop model for a side table in the bedroom and a wall model for the kitchen. Tyson concluded that any new design should be able to be used on either mounting. He also noticed that users would often try to hold the handset between their shoulder and chin, something that could not be easily done with the Trimline due to its rounded back and slippery plastic shell.

Tyson produced a new design roughly the size of the Trimline but in an angular enclosure with large flat areas on the handset that allowed it to be easily held on the shoulder. Tyson removed the Trimline's light-up dial, which, at that time required a bulky transformer plugged into a wall socket to power the lamp. He also widened the base to make it more stable and less likely to be pulled off a desk by the handset cord, and then moved the handset to the left side of the case to provide room on the right for future innovations such as a videophone screen. The resulting design was similar to the Trimline in overall layout, but somewhat larger and dramatically more striking and modern looking.

Tyson also took the advice of his teachers at OCAD and designed two phones, his own new design and another that exactly met the original requirements management had set down, which produced "an amorphous blob". About 18 months after joining Northern Electric he presented both models; his design immediately caught their eye and the original requirements were forgotten. The adoption of Tyson's design was followed by a naming contest, which initially lead toward either "Expo", due to the upcoming Expo 67, or "Tinkerbell", a play on the name of Dreyfuss' Princess model. Tyson eventually convinced everyone that Contempra was the right name.

1968 Prototype Field Trial Models

Prior to full-scale commercial manufacturing, Northern Electric produced a limited run of approximately 1,000 early sets in 1968 for field trial purposes while production tooling was still finalized. These field trial variants feature several distinct design and component variations from later production models:

- Logo Placement: The trial models feature a 1967 registered Northern Electric logo embossed directly on the face of the outer body shell, whereas later production versions moved the Contempra logo to this prominent position. Conversely, the trial sets feature a copyrighted Contempra logo stamped onto the metal base plate, a detail replaced by the Northern Electric logo on standard production bases.
- Ringer Control: The ringer volume control mechanism on the 1968 field trial models utilizes a notched design. This was phased out in production units in favour of a smooth lever-style control wheel.
- Internal Markings: The interior plastic moulding of the field trial bodies contains a small 1967 date stamp, reflecting the initial prototype design phase prior to the 1968 trial roll out.

Design Legacy

The Contempra was designed by industrial designer John F. Tyson. A rare surviving field-trial unit (Serial #1096) was formally authenticated and signed by Tyson on August 25, 2026, documenting the early physical evolution of the device.

Production began in late 1967. (Note: Sources vary greatly on the date, from 1967 through 1969. The 1968 date generally appears in US sources and may refer to its introduction in that country, but further research is warranted.) Tyson was sent on a publicity tour, demonstrating the phone on morning talk shows. Around the same time, the Carterfone opened the Bell network to direct connections by 3rd party suppliers, and Northern Electric began production of Contempra at a plant in Nashville, selling it through a network of resellers. In spite of its larger size, Contempra was dramatically more modern looking than the Trimline, which has been described as "a turtle finding refuge on a log", and was soon a staple of television shows and movies attempting to define the modern look.

The Contempra was an international licensing success, with fifteen licensees selling the design around the world. Notable among these was the 1977 licence to UK-based General Electric Company who built sets locally and sold them into the Post Office Telecommunications "Special Range Telephone" line, upscale designs that could be rented for an additional fee. A similar deal followed with Thomson-CSF in France.

In 1976, Northern Electric was rebranded as part of an ever-growing Northern Telecom. The next year they reorganized their product lines and Contempra became part of their new "Imagination" line of phones, similar to the UK Special Range. Ultimately, the empty area on the right of the phone was of little use and led to the introduction of the Contemprette model in 1982, which featured a smaller base that made it more comparable to the Trimline in size while still retaining the strong angular design of the original Contempra. It was sold primarily into the US market. In 1986, a lighter and slightly more rounded-off version of the Contemprette was introduced in Canada as the Silhouette.

== Design ==
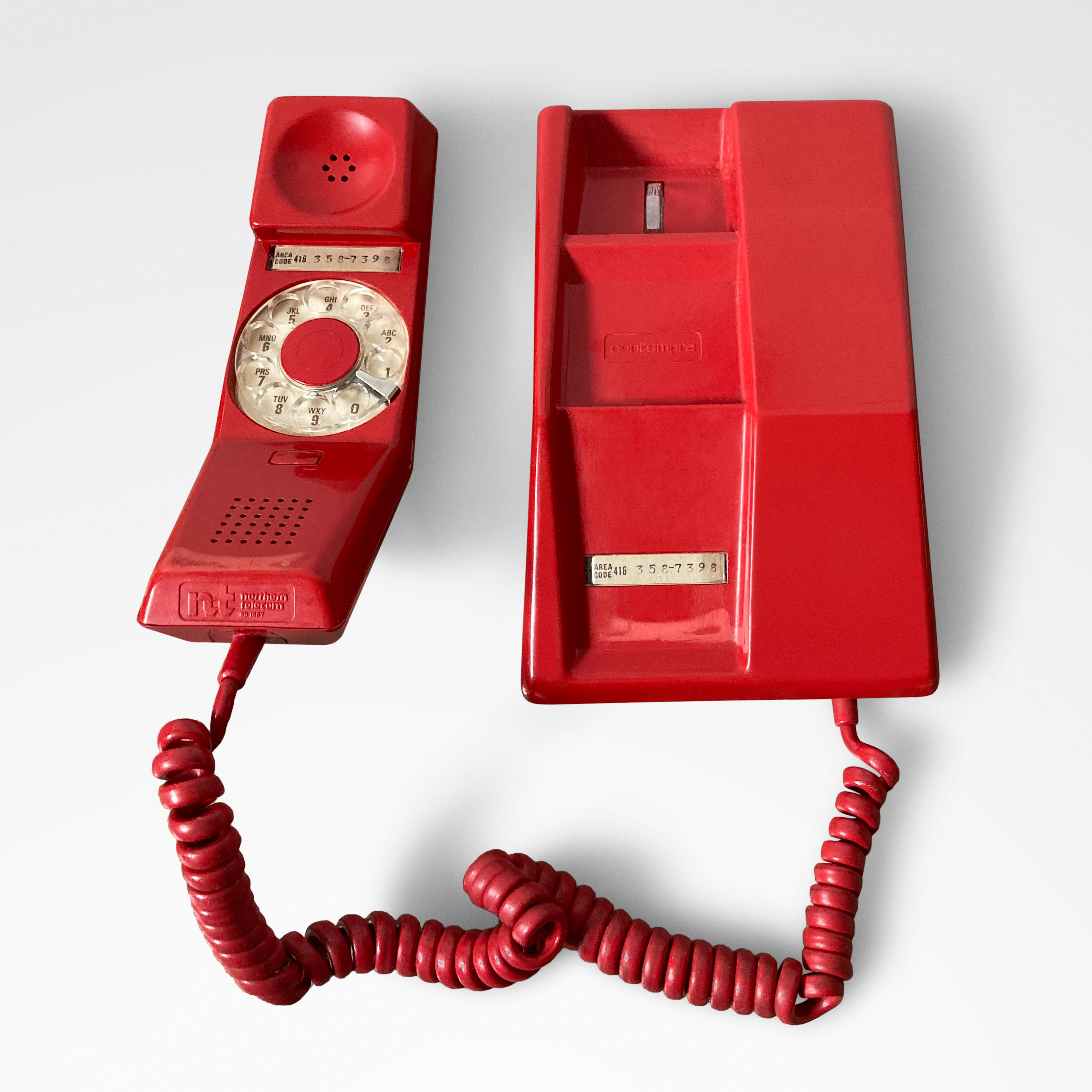
The handset used a miniaturized dial, possible through the use of the moving finger-stop. The flash button is visible just below the dial.

The outer casing of the Contempra was made of injection-moulded terpolymer and other modern plastics. The result was, by modern standards, very sturdy and relatively light for the era at 1.1 kilograms (2.4 lb). (Note: For comparison, the Model 500 was about double the weight of the Contempra, at just over 5 pounds (2.3 kg).)

The handset was essentially L-shaped, although the bend between top and bottom was about 40 degrees rather than 90. From above, it was roughly rectangular, tapering slightly towards the top and bottom. The speaker was in a raised section so that, when the handset was cradled on the shoulder, the speaker and dial were free of the cheek. The base was rectangular as seen from the top, and a triangle as seen from the side, matching the angle of the handset.

The upper and lower sides of the earpiece extension were angled relative to the base, and there was similar angling in the recess in the base where the earpiece sat when the phone was on-hook. The lower angle engaged a matching projection in the base that held the phone up when wall mounted. The angle at the top resulted in the handset naturally engaging the projection when it was placed back on the base. In addition to these features, the design of the base included a recess in the center that would accept the angle of the earpiece so that the handset could be hung from that area without engaging the hookswitch and ending the call.

The hookswitch, made of clear polycarbonite, was located in the base at the lower lip. A separate "recall" button, more commonly known as a "flash" button, was placed on the handset so that a new call could be placed without having to return the handset to the base to hang up. The handset was connected to the base using a coiled cord that was permanently connected at both ends in the Canadian versions, (Note: RJ9/10 was not yet popular for handsets in Canada.) and required disassembly of the phone to replace. The cord connected to the base on the right, so the cord fell in a U shape when hanging from the wall. A wheel, almost hidden under the base on the right, controlled the volume of the ringer.

The original model used the same moving-finger-stop dial design of the Trimline. In order for a digit to register when dialled, the dial must rotate a minimum angular distance so that the return motion generates the "flashes" that produce the number. On earlier designs like the Model 500, this was implemented by leaving a gap between the digit 1 and the finger-stop, about 45 degrees. In the moving-finger-stop design there was no gap between the 1 and the finger-stop, instead, the finger-stop itself was able to rotate that same amount to produce the required motion. Removing the gap allowed the entire dial to be reduced in diameter while still using the same size finger holes.

Although Touch-Tone service was introduced in Canada in 1964 it was not until 1971 that a Touch-Tone version of the Contempra was released. The Touch-Tone models replaced the in-handset dial with a separate pushbutton unit, but the system as a whole was otherwise unchanged.

== Accolades ==
The Contempra was a darling of the design world when it was introduced, being featured in journals in the industrial design and telephony markets. It was awarded a citation by the Canada Design Council and went on to be part of the permanent collections of the Design Exchange and the Canadian Museum of History. In 1974 it was featured on a postage stamp commemorating 100 years of telephone development in the country.
