= Donald Genaro =

Donald M. Genaro
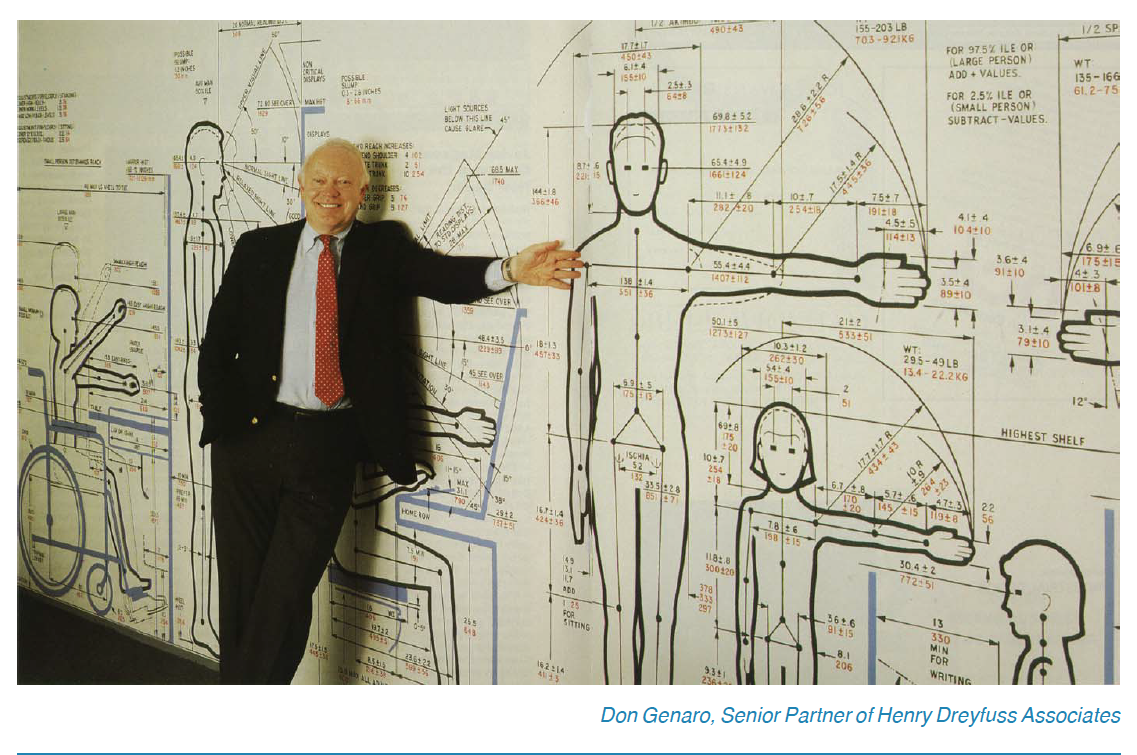
- Born: 1932 (age 93–94); Hoboken, New Jersey
- Occupation: Industrial designer

Donald M. Genaro (born 1932) is a retired American industrial designer. He was president of Henry Dreyfuss Associates up to 1994. He has been recognized by The New York Times for his contribution to industrial design.

== Biography ==
Genaro was born in Hoboken, New Jersey, where he attended public school. He served an apprenticeship at the architecture firm of F.W. Fisher but left to serve the U.S. army during the Korean War. After mustering out he entered the Pratt Institute where he graduated in 1957 with a degree in industrial design. A year before completing his studies, Genaro started a work/study program at the offices of Henry Dreyfuss and he remained with the firm after graduation.

Genaro took on several projects among Henry Dreyfuss' corporate clients and was made an associate in 1963. He became a partner shortly thereafter and worked alongside Henry Dreyfuss until Dreyfuss' retirement in 1969. Genaro then remained the senior partner until his retirement from the firm in 1994. Throughout his career Genaro oversaw product development, ergonomic, graphic and architectural/interior design projects for AT&T, Bell Labs, John Deere, Polaroid, Singer Corporation, American Standard and Bankers Trust, among others. He has also consulted with Olivetti, British Aircraft Corporation, Matsushita Electric and Hitachi.

Genaro has lectured on design at Ohio State University, Carnegie Mellon, Columbia University, the Pratt Institute and the Rhode Island School of Design.

After retirement, he assumed the role of Chairman of the Board of Directors of Pascack Valley Hospital in Westwood, New Jersey.

== Notable designs ==
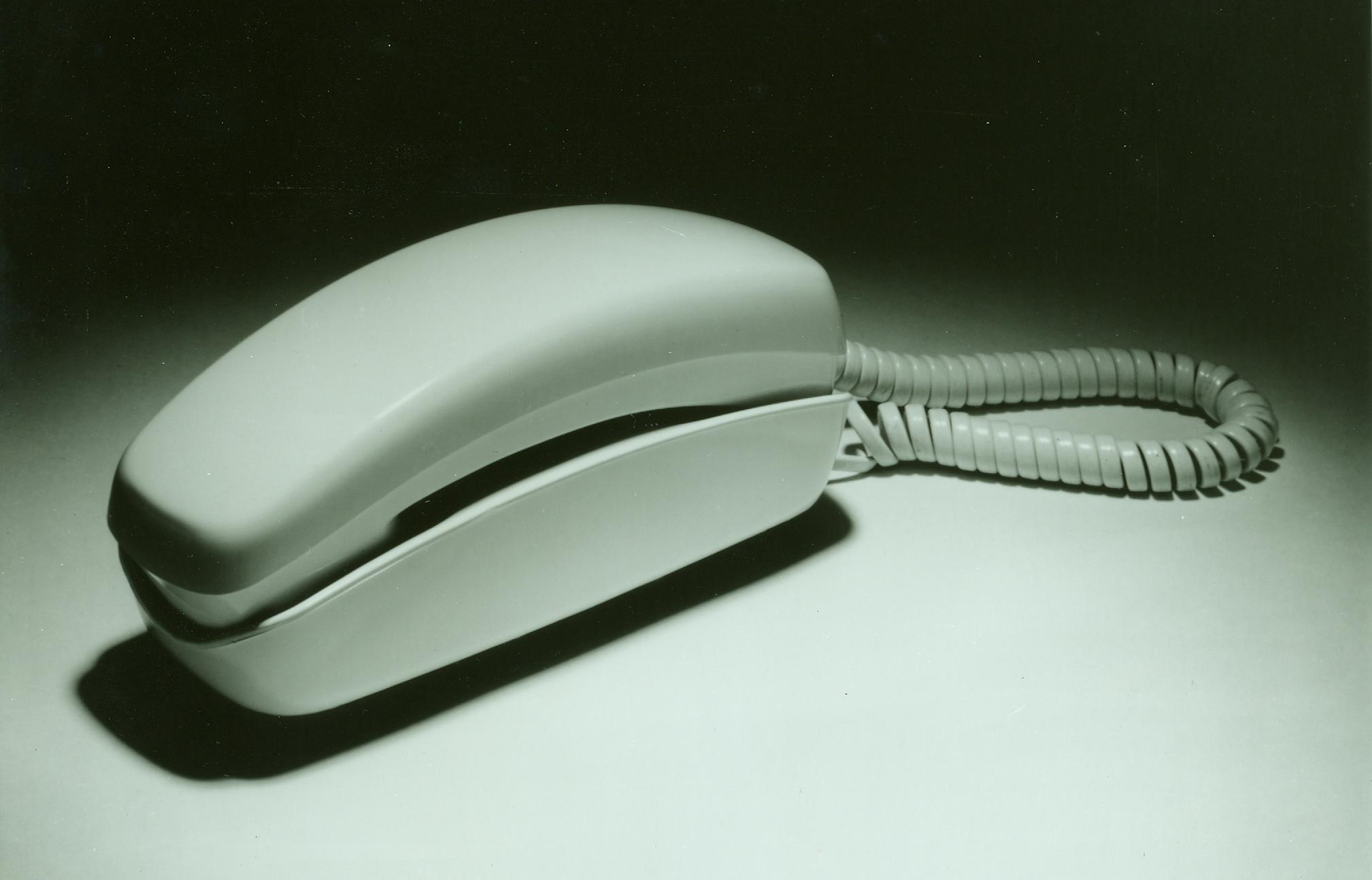
The Trimline phone - one of Genaro's most notable designs

One of Genaro's most notable designs is the compact 1965 Trimline phone which was designed for AT&T with the Bell Labs and manufactured by Bell System's Western Electric company. This design was notable for moving the dial from the base to the handset, a legacy carried on in all modern cell phones. It was also among the first phones to use the RJ11 modular phone plug and jack, a connecting device now found on numerous products.

Genaro also worked on Singer Sewing Machines, the Bard-Parker scalpel, John Deere tractors, Polaroid cameras, building and aircraft interiors for American Airlines, the Flicker razor, and sinks and faucets for American Standard, among others.

== Achievements and awards ==
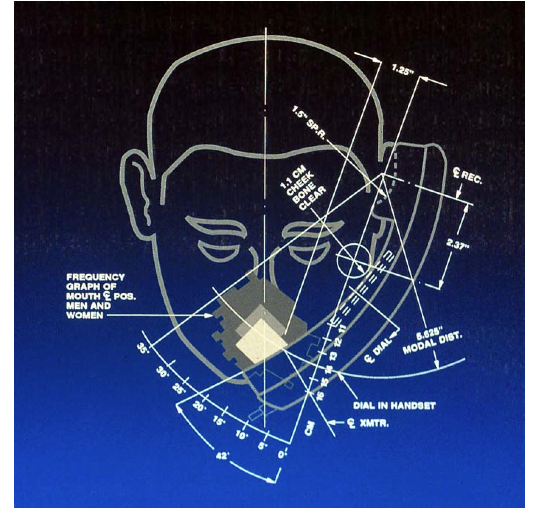
Ergonomic design was integral to devices Genaro helped to design

In 1985, The New York Times described Genaro as "one of a small but growing fraternity that decides the shapes, sizes and colors of everyday products—pens and stoves, belt buckles and cars". His designs have obtained awards from professional organizations and publications, as well as coverage in Fortune, Business Week, Time and Advertising Age. His designs feature in collections at the Museum of Modern Art and National Design Museum. He holds over 150 US patents.

== Professional organization membership ==
Genaro is a member of the Industrial Designers Society of America.

== Personal life ==
Genaro lives with his family in Haworth, New Jersey, in a house he designed in the mid-1960s.

== See also ==
- Henry Dreyfuss
- Western Electric
- Trimline telephone
