= Model 5302 telephone =

Type of American telephones by the Bell System

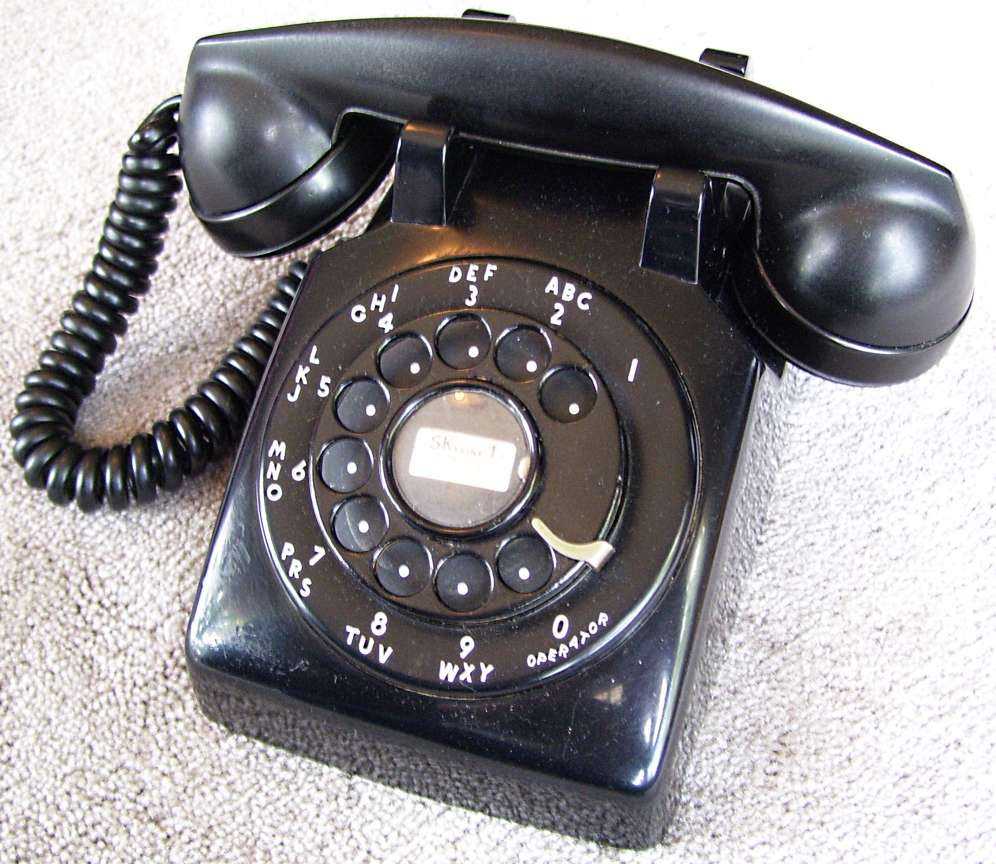
The 5302 telephone.

The model 5302 telephone was a look-alike product to the 500-type telephone that was introduced as a stopgap by Western Electric in 1955 to meet the increasing post-World War II demand for a modernized telephone. It reused existing component supplies from the older model 302 that the model 502 replaced. The 302 had been issued since 1937, but starting in 1950, units were replaced with the new 500-series sets, without having served their useful component life.

The 5300 and 5400 series of telephones consisted of the 300-series and the 400-series models converted to approach the appearance and performance of the model 500. This was accomplished with a new housing, new number ring and dial plate, and a ringer volume control that could be adjusted by users. The model numbering for these sets was derived from the converted 300 or 400 series units by prefixing those model numbers with the digit 5. In addition to the model 5302, the series also consisted of the specialty models 5304, 5306, and 5410 telephone sets.

== Design ==
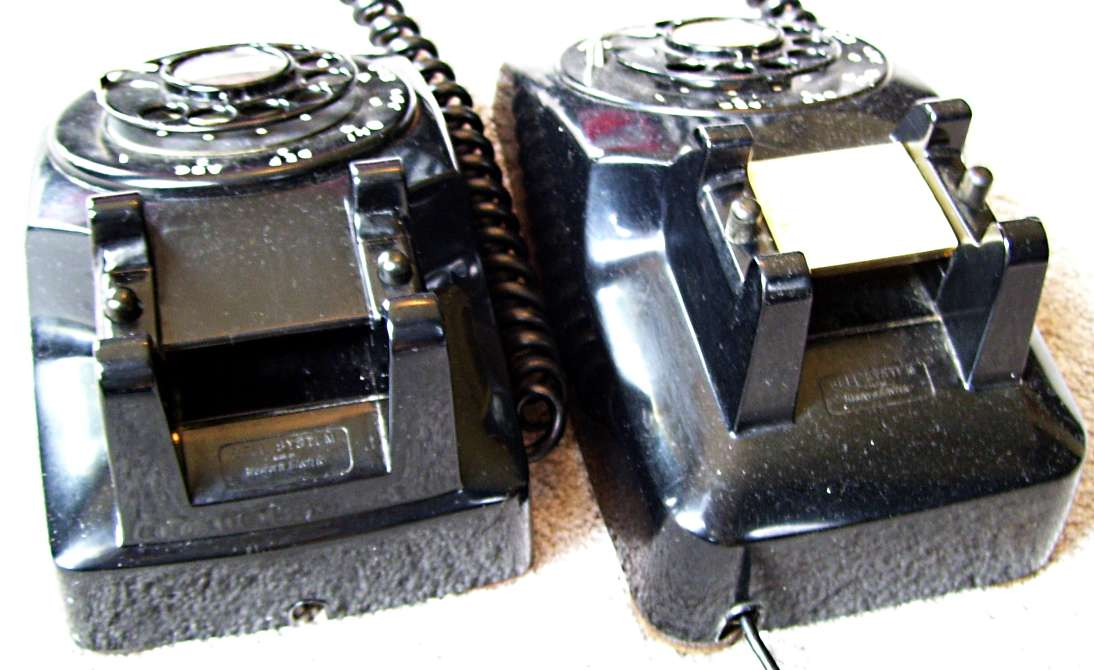
While similar to the model 500, the 5302 (left phone) had a shorter base as it lacks the 500's bustle behind the handset.

Conceived years after the 1949 introduction of the model 500, the model 5302 essentially was a 302 telephone under a new cover. It was introduced to reuse the existing large stock of parts from the pre-WWII era 302 model in the refurbishing plants as those were replaced with 500 series sets, while providing the modern style elements of the 500 telephone.

The new shell design was based on the 500 design and accommodated the shorter model 302 base. As the model 302 had the dial and hook switch mounted on the phone shell, the 5302 accommodated that design, in contrast to the model 500, which had all components mounted on the phone base. Like the 500, the dial displayed the numbers and letters on the outside of the finger wheel. The dial mechanism was actually the smaller 5H dial from the model 302, relabeled as 5M to account for the new number plate, or one of newer 6-series dials (6H).

The cradle can accommodate the earlier F1 handset from the 302 or the newer, wider G-type of the 500. A special G-type handset, commonly referred to as GF but labeled G1, produced for the model 5302 out of Bakelite like the model 302 rather than the model 502's plastic was completed by August 1955. It used an F1 transmitter and contained a plastic insert to allow for the use of an HA receiver, as in the 302. The use of the old transmitter and receiver avoided elevating sidetone on short loops as was the result with the more efficient G handset when used without equalization circuitry. When issued with the G1 handset, as in the 500 model phone, the handset contained U1 and T1 elements.

The majority of model 5302 telephones had the original F1 handset and were preferentially installed in areas near the central offices, while the set with the G1 handset could be deployed on long loops because of better gain characteristics of the handset.

== Production ==
Internal Bell System documents time the introduction of this model into the second half of 1955. Deployment continued into the mid-1960s. The 5302 sets were not manufactured on the normal production lines but were assembled in the refurbishment shops in the distribution centers and by sub-contractors.

While the 5302 was primarily produced in black, 5300 type telephone housings were also produced in small quantities in the pastel colors blue, pink, beige, and white, when these became available circa 1958.

The 5300-series phones were produced in several variants other than the standard single-line (5302) model. The party line models were the 5304 and 5306, and the 5410 was a two-line model.
