= Honeywell T87 =

Thermostat

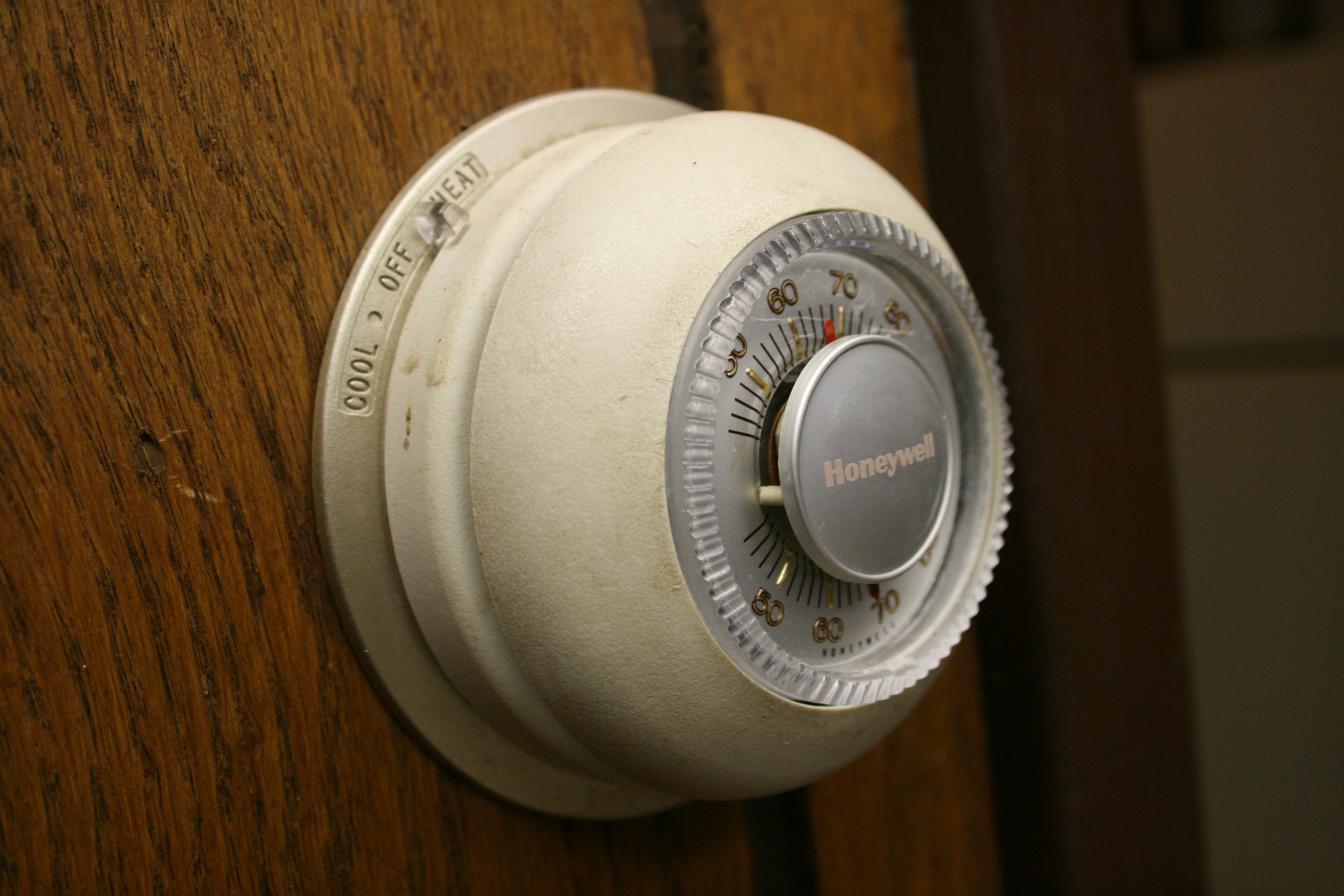
Honeywell T87

The Honeywell T87 Round Thermostat is a thermostat that Honeywell International, Inc. first manufactured in 1953. Henry Dreyfuss designed the thermostat based on a concept by Honeywell engineer Carl Kronmiller.
