= Princess telephone =

Type of American telephones by the Bell System

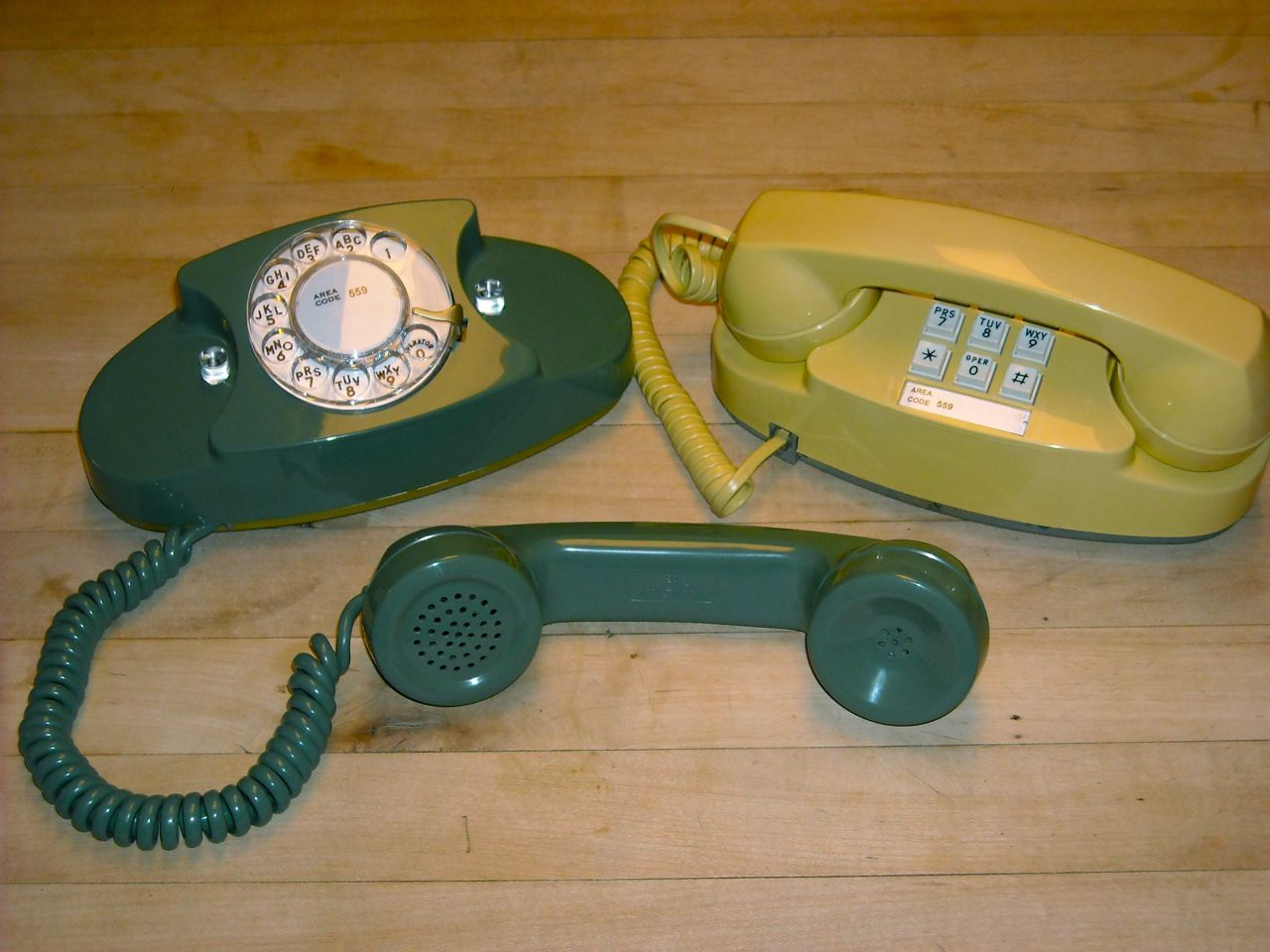
Western Electric Princess telephones

The Princess telephone was introduced by the Bell System in 1959. It was a compact telephone designed for convenient use in the bedroom, and contained a light-up dial for use as a night-light. It was commonly advertised with the slogan "It's little...It's lovely...It lights", which was suggested by Robert Karl Lethin, an AT&T employee.

The Princess was initially designed by industrial designer Henry Dreyfuss, who had designed previous Western Electric models with the Bell Labs engineers. Later redesigns involved Donald Genaro of the Dreyfuss design firm. Genaro redesigned the case so that it could be more easily picked up.

Contemporary advertising demonstrates that this telephone was marketed to women, hence its feminine model name. The model was available in a broad range of colors, including pink, red, yellow, moss-green, black, white, beige, ivory, light-blue, turquoise, and gray.

The telephone was produced at the Western Electric Indianapolis, and later Shreveport Works plants, also the production location of 500 and 2500 series telephones. The Trimline telephone is often confused with the Princess because the Trimline dial lights up, although the dial on the Trimline is in the handset.

The Princess required an external electric transformer to power the lighted dial. The dial was mounted in the center on the base of the telephone. When Western Electric commenced production they did not yet have a ringer small enough to fit inside the case. The phone was introduced without containing a ringer, but an external ringer box could be added.

Early versions of the Princess, those not containing a ringer, had the model number 701B. Customers complained that the phone was so light that it would slide on surfaces while dialing, so an optional lead weight was added to fill the space intended for the ringer.

Later models included the M1A ringer. The rotary dial version with ringer was known as the 702B, while the modular cord variant was labeled 702BM. The model 711B had a slide switch or push-button and was a two-line phone with exclusion on the first line. The ten-button Touch Tone version was known as the 1702B, and when twelve-button keypad were introduced the phone was labeled as 2702B. The modular cord version of this was the 2702BM. Several other variants existed.

The Princess underwent several changes in its production run:

- In 1963, the Bell System introduced touchtone dialing, and Western Electric began production of a touch-tone model, with 10 numerical keys, lacking today's * and # keys. The internals of the Princess were reduced in size the same year, allowing a small, quiet bell ringer to be placed to the left of the touch-tone dial.
- In the mid-1970s, AT&T introduced modular connectors for the line cord and handset cords, requiring the RJ11 standard home telephone jack. Most customers who had Princess telephones were converted to modular jacks.
- In 1983, AT&T was preparing itself for divestiture of the Bell System. It started American Bell, Inc., a separate sales subsidiary of Western Electric and the Bell Operating Companies. AT&T introduced a non-light up dial with white keys to be sold in Phone Center Stores. These sets were marked CS on the bottom, for consumer sales. Post-divestiture colors added after 1984 included peach, dark gray, slate blue and cameo (light) green.
- In 1993, the Princess was extensively redesigned. Although it retained the same handset and oval footprint which it had since its introduction, it now used a new dial. This dial still required an external transformer for night-light use. A handset volume control was added to the dial pad. The phone number card was moved from below the dial pad to the location of the cradle for the transmitter. This model was called the Signature Princess, and was freely available for lease; only available for purchase at AT&T Phone Centers, which closed in 1996.

In 1994, AT&T ended production of the Princess telephone. It continues to lease the Signature Princess model. Due to its removal from production, and its attractive design, the Princess has become a collectible phone. Princess telephones in pink, turquoise, and black are among the rarest colors of the phones and most valuable.

Automatic Electric offered a lighted-rotary-dial model of similar proportions but with a rectangular, rather than elliptical, footprint, called the Starlite Phone, and later offered a non-lighted 12-key touch-tone model simply called the Desk Compact.

== See also ==
- Bell System Practices
