= Henry Dreyfuss =

American industrial designer (1904–1972)

- Born: March 2, 1904; Brooklyn, New York City, U.S.
- Died: October 5, 1972 (aged 68); South Pasadena, California, U.S.
- Occupation: Industrial designer
- Spouse: Doris Marks Dreyfuss
- Children: 3

Henry Dreyfuss (March 2, 1904 – October 5, 1972) was an American industrial designer. He is known for designing the Western Electric Model 500 telephone, the Westclox Big Ben alarm clock, and the Honeywell T87 Round Thermostat.

== Career ==
Dreyfuss, a native of Brooklyn, New York City, is one of the celebrity industrial designers of the 1930s and 1940s who pioneered his field. Dreyfuss dramatically improved the look, feel, and usability of dozens of consumer products. Sometimes compared to Raymond Loewy and other contemporaries, Dreyfuss was much more than a stylist; he applied common sense and a scientific approach to design problems, making products more pleasing to the eye and hand, safer to use, and more efficient to manufacture and repair. His work helped popularize the role of the industrial designer while also contributing significant advances to the fields of ergonomics, anthropometrics and human factors.

Dreyfuss began as a Broadway theatrical designer. Until 1920, he apprenticed under Norman Bel Geddes, who would later become one of his competitors. In 1929, Dreyfuss opened his own office for theatrical and industrial design. His firm met with commercial success, and continued as Henry Dreyfuss Associates for over four decades after his death.

=== Academic Affiliations ===
Dreyfuss became a trustee of the California Institute of Technology (Caltech) in 1963. For many years prior, he had been a member of the Engineering Division faculty and had lectured annually on industrial design. After taking a seat on the board, he encouraged the trustees to seek eminent architects for new buildings at the institute.

Dreyfuss was also a member of the faculty at the University of California, Los Angeles (UCLA).

=== Designs ===
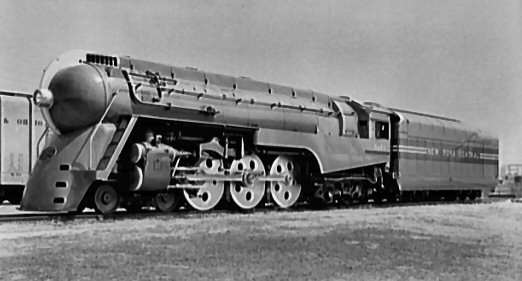
One of the NYC Hudsons given a streamlined casing of Henry Dreyfuss's design to haul the 20th Century Limited

- Hoover model 150 vacuum cleaner (1936)
- Several Westclox Big Ben alarm clocks (1931–1956). The style 3 (1931), 4 (1934), 5 (1939) and 6 (1949) Big and Baby Ben cases were all designed by Dreyfuss.
- New York Central Railroad's streamlined Mercury train, both locomotive and passenger cars (1936)
- New York Central Hudson locomotive for the 20th Century Limited (1938)
- Popular Democracity model city of the future at the 1939 New York World's Fair at the Trylon and Perisphere
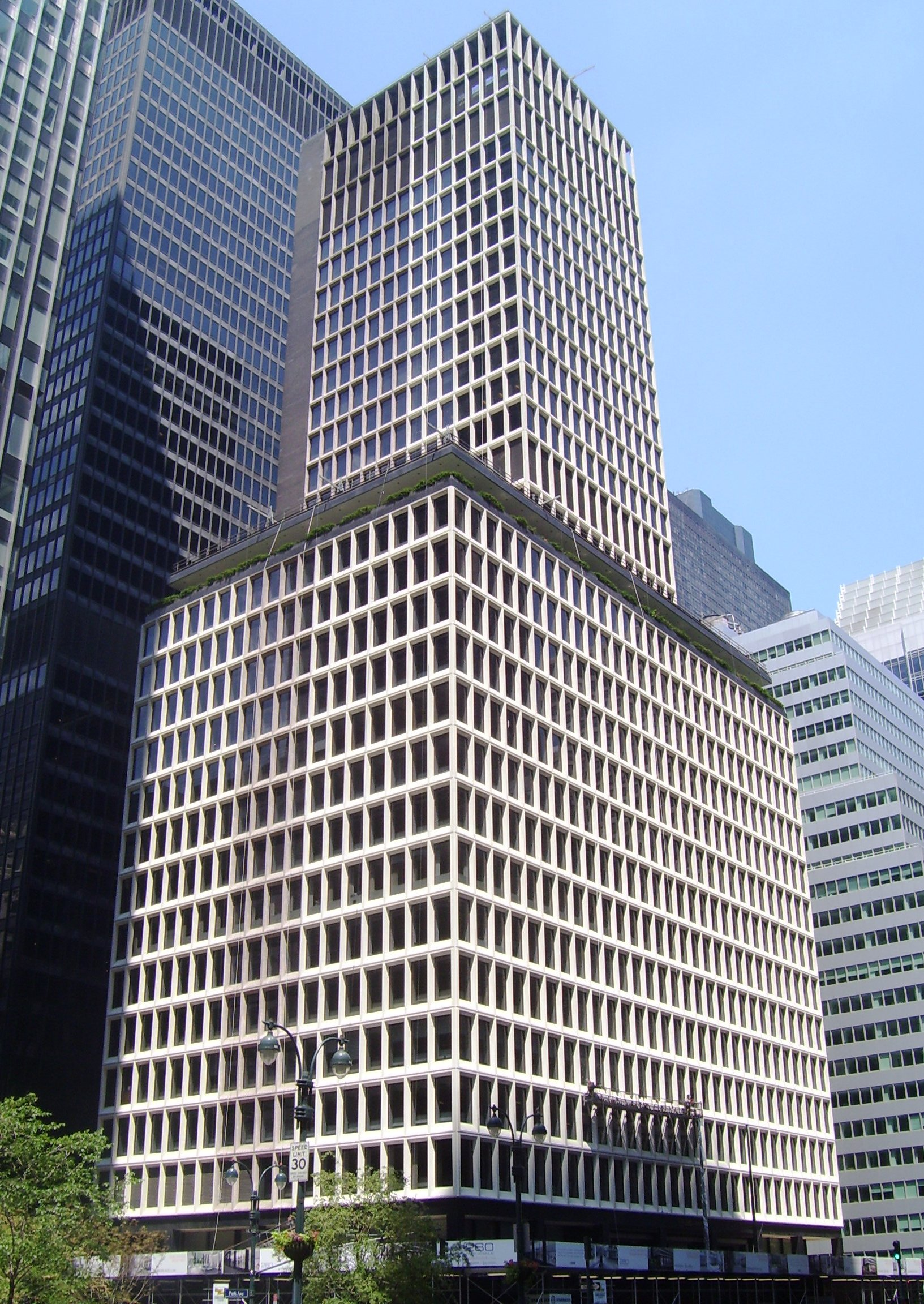
  280 Park Avenue in Manhattan
- Styled John Deere Model A, B, and H tractors (1938)
- Wahl-Eversharp Skyline fountain pen (1940)
- Royal Typewriter Company's Quiet DeLuxe (late 1940s)
- Bell System telephones: Western Electric 500-series desk and wall telephones (1949 – 1972), Princess telephone (1959), Model 1500 10 digit touchtone (1963), Model 2500 12-digit touchtone (1968–present), and the Trimline telephone (1965–present)
- Two American ocean liners, SS Independence and SS Constitution for American Export Lines (1951–2)
- Honeywell T87 "the Round" circular wall thermostat (1953–present)
- Spherical Hoover model 82 Constellation vacuum cleaner which floated on an air cushion of its own exhaust (1954)
- Hoover model 65 convertible vacuum cleaner (1957)
- John Deere 1010, 2010, 3010, and 4010 tractors (1960)
- Bankers Trust Building at 280 Park Avenue in Manhattan, New York City, with Emery Roth & Sons (1963)
- American Airlines branding (1960s)
- Polaroid SX-70 Land camera (1972)

== Later life and death ==
In 1955, Dreyfuss wrote Designing for People. A window into Dreyfuss's career as an industrial designer, the book illustrated his ethical and aesthetic principles, included design case studies, many anecdotes, and an explanation of his "Joe" and "Josephine" anthropometric charts. In 1960 he published The Measure of Man, a collection of ergonomic reference charts providing designers precise specifications for product designs. In 1965, Dreyfuss became the first President of the Industrial Designers Society of America (IDSA). In 1969, Dreyfuss retired from the firm he founded, but continued serving many of the companies he worked with as board member and consultant.

In 1972 Dreyfuss published The Symbol Sourcebook, An Authoritative Guide to International Graphic Symbols. This dictionary was based on an archive of thousands of symbols that Dreyfuss had amassed by distributing surveys to American clients and corporations, as well as a range of international organizations. It was a feat to organize and present such a range of data cogently in an age before computers. One reviewer, in 1972, praised the book’s “innovations in cross-referencing” for visual material, which included an index, classification with descriptive terms, and a multilingual table of contents. The review also designated Dreyfuss's publication to be an “authoritative guide” to symbols and an “essential reference.” Dreyfuss hoped that the publication would be the foundation of an ongoing project to collect and catalogue symbols. Continued interest in this project is evidenced by a subsequent, posthumous paperback reprint in 1984. The Sourcebook has also served as a reference for artists, most notably in paintings by Jean-Michel Basquiat in the 1980s.

On October 5, 1972, Henry Dreyfuss (aged 68) and his wife and business partner Doris Marks Dreyfuss (aged 69) committed suicide together. Mrs. Dreyfuss was terminally ill at the time. The couple was survived by their son, John A., and their two daughters, Ann and Mrs. George C. Wilson Jr.
