= Sise =

Sise is a surname. Notable people with the surname include:

- Charles Fleetford Sise, Sr, Canadian businessman
- Charles Fleetford Sise Jr, Canadian businessman
- Edward Fleetford Sise, Canadian businessman
- Gage Sise, Officer in the Royal New Zealand Air Force
- Hazen Sise, Canadian architect, educator, and humanitarian
- Joe Sise (born 1989), Swedish footballer
- Paul Fleetford Sise, Canadian businessman

== See also ==
- Si*Sé, an electronic music group from the US
- Sisse, a Danish female given name
- Size (disambiguation)
