= Cellcom Communications =

- Type: Private
- Industry: Telecommunications
- Founded: 1985
- Founder: Anthony Sleiman
- Headquarters: Montreal, Quebec, Canada, Toronto, Ontario, Canada
- Products: Fixed line and mobile telephony Internet services Digital television
- Number of employees: 500 (2014)
- Website: www.cellcom.ca

Cellcom Communications or Cellcom is a telecommunications company based in Montreal, Quebec and the largest dealer of Bell Canada & Bell Mobility in Canada with 63 stores across Ontario, Quebec, New Brunswick.

== History ==
Cellcom's parent company, Bell Canada Enterprises, was founded in 1880 and named after Alexander Graham Bell, the inventor of the telephone and the co-founder of Bell Telephone Company. Cellcom Communications was established in 1985. Shortly after cellular phones were emerging into the telecommunications industry, Cellcom was among the first distributors for Bell Canada in the Greater Montreal Area.

In the span of four decades, Cellcom has gone from a single retail store outlet, to 36 stores in Quebec and 18 in Ontario. Heavily investing in Wireless technology, Cellcom has differentiated itself from other small telecommunications retailers by branching out into the corporate realm. Currently, Cellcom has over 900 corporate clients, and roughly over 250,000 consumer customers. They are a distributor and provider for the Canadian wireless industry.

== Virgin Plus ==
Cellcom operates several Bell Canada kiosks in the Greater Montreal Area. Cellcom also serves several Virgin Plus kiosks in Quebec. Virgin Plus is a subsidiary to Bell Canada, and is a provider of postpaid wireless voice, text, data, and home internet as well as television.

== Talks of Expansion ==
Currently Cellcom is expanding further in the Canadian market, currently operates 64 different locations, most being in the Greater Toronto Area.

== Locations ==
Cellcom Communications operates 64 stores across Quebec, Ontario & New Brunswick areas.

=== Quebec Locations ===
- Bell Bourassa - 6000 Boulevard Henri Bourassa E, Montréal
- Bell Carrefour Laval - (both kiosk and store) 3035 Boulevard Le Carrefour, Laval
- Bell Centre Laval - 1600 Boulevard Le Corbusier, Laval
- Bell Chagnon - 1200 Boulevard Alphonse Desjardins, Lévis
- Bell Décarie - 5355 Rue Des Jockeys, Montréal
- Bell Des Sources - 3476 Boulevard Des Sources, Dollard-Des-Ormeaux
- Bell Dolbeau - 1471 Boulevard Wallberg, Dolbeau
- Bell Dorion - 84 Boulevard Hardwood, Vaudreuil
- Bell Drummondville - 755 Boulevard René-Levesque, Drummondville
- Bell Joliette - 1075 Boulevard Firestore, Joliette
- Bell La Baie - 931 Rue Bagot, La Baie
- Bell Saint-Eustache - 367 Boulevard Arthur Sauvé, Saint-Eustache
- Bell Promenades Beauport - 3333 Rue Du Carrefour, Québec
- Bell Roberval - 1221 Boulevard Marcotte
- Bell Sorel - 450 Boulevard Poliquin, Sorel-Tracy
- Bell Saint-Jérôme - 900 Boulevard Grignon, Saint-Jérôme
- Bell Saint-Sauveur - 153 Rue Principale, Saint-Sauveur
- Bell Saint-Martin - 1655 Boulevard Saint-Martin O, Laval
- Bell Saint-Denis - 4337 Rue Saint-Denis, Montréal
- Bell Sainte-Dorothée - 916 Autoroute Chomedey O, Laval
- Bell Sainte-Agathe - 217 Rue Principale E, Sainte-Agathe Des Monts
- Bell Saint-Felicien - 1179 Boulevard Saint-Felicien, Saint-Felicien
- Bell Saint-Jovite - 517 Rue Saint-Jovite, Mont-Tremblant
- Bell Vaudreuil - 3120 Boulevard De La Gare, Vaudreuil
- Bell Versailes - 7275 Rue Sherbrooke E, Montréal
- Bell Vertu - 3131 Boulevard de le Côte-Vertu, Montréal
- Cellcom Corporate Store - 5200 Rue Paré, Montréal
- Virgin Bourassa - 6000 Boulevard Henri Bourassa E, Montréal
- Virgin Centre Laval - 1600 Boulevard Le Corbusier, Laval
- Virgin Drummondville - 755 Boulevard Rene-Levesque, Montréal
- Virgin Versailles - 7275 Sherbrooke E, Montréal

=== Ontario Locations ===
- Bell Alliston - 36 Young Street, Alliston
- Bell Aurora - 91 First Commerce Drive, Aurora
- Bell Bank Street - 247 Bank Street, Ottawa
- Bell Barrhaven - 50 Marketplace Avenue, Nepean
- Bell Bolton - 40 McEwan Drive, Bolton
- Bell Bowmanville - 2377 Highway 2, Bowmanville
- Bell Cobourg - 1111 Eglin Street W, Cobourg
- Bell Collingwood - 122 Hurontario Street, Collingwood
- Bell Hunt Club - 280 West Hunt Club Road, Nepean
- Bell Kingston Center - 1040 Princess Street, Kingston
- Bell Midland - 297 King Street, Midland
- Bell Oshawa - 1383 Wilson Road N, Oshawa
- Bell Smiths Falls - 123 Lombard Street, Smiths Falls
- Bell Stittsville - 1261 Main Street, Stittsville
- Bell Sudbury - 1545 Regent Street, Sudbury
- Bell Taylor Kidd - 599 Taylor Kidd Boulevard, Kingston

== See also ==
- Glentel, a joint retail venture of Bell and Rogers
- Bell Mobility, the division of Bell Canada which sells wireless services in Canada
