= Ian Scott (Canadian businessman) =

Canadian telecom executive

Chairperson of the Canadian Radio-television and Telecommunications Commission
- In office 5 September 2017 – 4 January 2023
- Preceded by: Jean-Pierre Blais
- Succeeded by: Vicky Eatrides

Personal details
- Born: Montreal, Quebec

Ian Scott is a Canadian telecom executive who served as the Chairperson of the Canadian Radio-television and Telecommunications Commission (CRTC) from 2017 to 2023.

Scott was born in Montreal, Quebec. After graduating from the McGill University with an honours BA in political science in 1980, Scott joined the Competition Bureau. From 1990 to 1994, Scott worked in the telecom directorate at the CRTC. Scott then joined the private sector, working for Call-Net Enterprises (now part of Rogers Telecom), the Canadian Cable Television Association, and Telus as a lobbyist with the title of vice-president of federal government relations. Between 2007 and 2008, Scott also served as Senior Policy Advisor to the Chairman at the CRTC. Prior to his appointment to CRTC, Scott was serving as the executive director of government and regulatory affairs at Telesat.

In July 2017, Scott's appointment as the Chairperson of CRTC was announced. The announcement and Scott's background drew concerns from consumer advocacy group OpenMedia.ca. Scott's five-year term began on September 5, 2017, succeeding Jean-Pierre Blais in the role. He was succeeded by Vicky Eatrides.

In December 2019, Scott was caught drinking beer with Bell executive Mirko Bibic (then COO of Bell, currently CEO) at D'Arcy McGee's pub in Ottawa. This meeting took place just one week after Bell filed their appeal of the CRTC's 2019 wholesale rates.

In February 2022, Scott faced calls to recuse from files related to internet competition due to alleged bias, after the meeting with Bell executive resurfaced. The call for recusal was refused by CRTC.

Government offices
Preceded by Jean-Pierre Blais	Chairman of the CRTC; 2017–2023	Succeeded by Vicky Eatrides
