= Mirko Bibic =

Canadian businessman

- Born: 1967 or 1968 (age 58–59)
- Occupation: Businessman
- Title: President and CEO of BCE Inc. and Bell Canada

Mirko Bibic is a Canadian businessman who is president and CEO of BCE Inc. and its wholly owned subsidiary Bell Canada.

== Education and early career ==
Bibic was raised in Montreal by immigrant parents; his father, Veljko, was a carpenter from Serbia while his mother was an administrator born in France. He is a graduate of both McGill University and the University of Toronto Faculty of Law.

Bibic began his career as a lawyer with the law firm Stikeman Elliott. He became the managing partner of the firm's City of Ottawa office in 2003.

== BCE Inc./Bell Canada ==
Bibic joined Bell in 2004 as Senior Vice President, Regulatory, and has since served as Executive Vice President, Corporate Development and as Chief Legal and Regulatory Officer. Mirko was promoted to COO of BCE Inc. in October 2018. In 2019, Bibic was accused on malfeasances when he was seen meeting with CRTC chief Ian Scott one week after Bell filed their appeal of the CRTC's 2019 wholesale rates.

Bibic succeeded the retiring George A. Cope as president and CEO of BCE Inc. in January 2020.

Since Mr. Bibic has been at the helm of BCE, the stock has lost over 50% of its value. Plunging almost $5 in less than a week after the announcement to acquire the US fibre internet provider, Ziply.

== Other interests ==
In 2022, he was named to the board of directors for the Royal Bank of Canada.
