= Jean-Pierre Blais =

Canadian lawyer, public servant and executive

Chairperson of the Canadian Radio-television and Telecommunications Commission
- In office 18 June 2012 – June 2017
- Preceded by: Leonard Katz
- Succeeded by: Ian Scott

Jean-Pierre Blais (born c. 1960) is a Canadian lawyer, public servant and executive who formerly served as the assistant deputy minister, receiver general and pension for Canada (2018–2022), as the chairman of the Canadian Radio-television and Telecommunications Commission (CRTC) from June 18, 2012, until June 2017, and as assistant deputy minister of cultural affairs for the Department of Canadian Heritage.

== Early life and education ==
Blais was raised in the province of Québec, with French as his first language, but learned English at an early age when his family moved to Toronto. He later returned to Montreal and attended Loyola High School.

He completed a Bachelor of Civil Law degree and a Bachelor of Common Law degree at McGill University. He also completed a Master of Laws degree at the University of Melbourne in Australia.

== Career ==
From 1994 to 2004 he was a lawyer at a Montreal law firm. After this job, he worked as senior legal counsel, general counsel for broadcasting and then executive director of broadcasting at the CRTC. Then he was assistant deputy minister of international and intergovernmental affairs at the Department of Canadian Heritage, a department which has a mandate for a range of arts, culture, and heritage portfolios. He was in this role for the 2010 Vancouver Winter Games. He also negotiated the UNESCO Treaty on Doping in Sports.

From 2004 to 2011, he was assistant deputy minister of cultural affairs at the Department of Canadian Heritage. His was responsible for included legislation, policies and programs in copyright, TV and radio broadcasting, digital media, cultural industries (books, magazines, etc.) and the arts. He was also responsible for trade policy in culture and cultural treaties. As the director of investment, he was responsible for overseeing transactions in the cultural sector that came under the purview of the Investment Canada Act.

He was assistant secretary of the Treasury Board Secretariat's Government Operations Sector starting in 2011. He was chairman and CEO of the CRTC until June 2017.

Government offices
Preceded by Leonard Katz (interim)	Chairman of the CRTC; 2012–2017	Succeeded by Ian Scott
