= Salle Wilfrid-Pelletier =

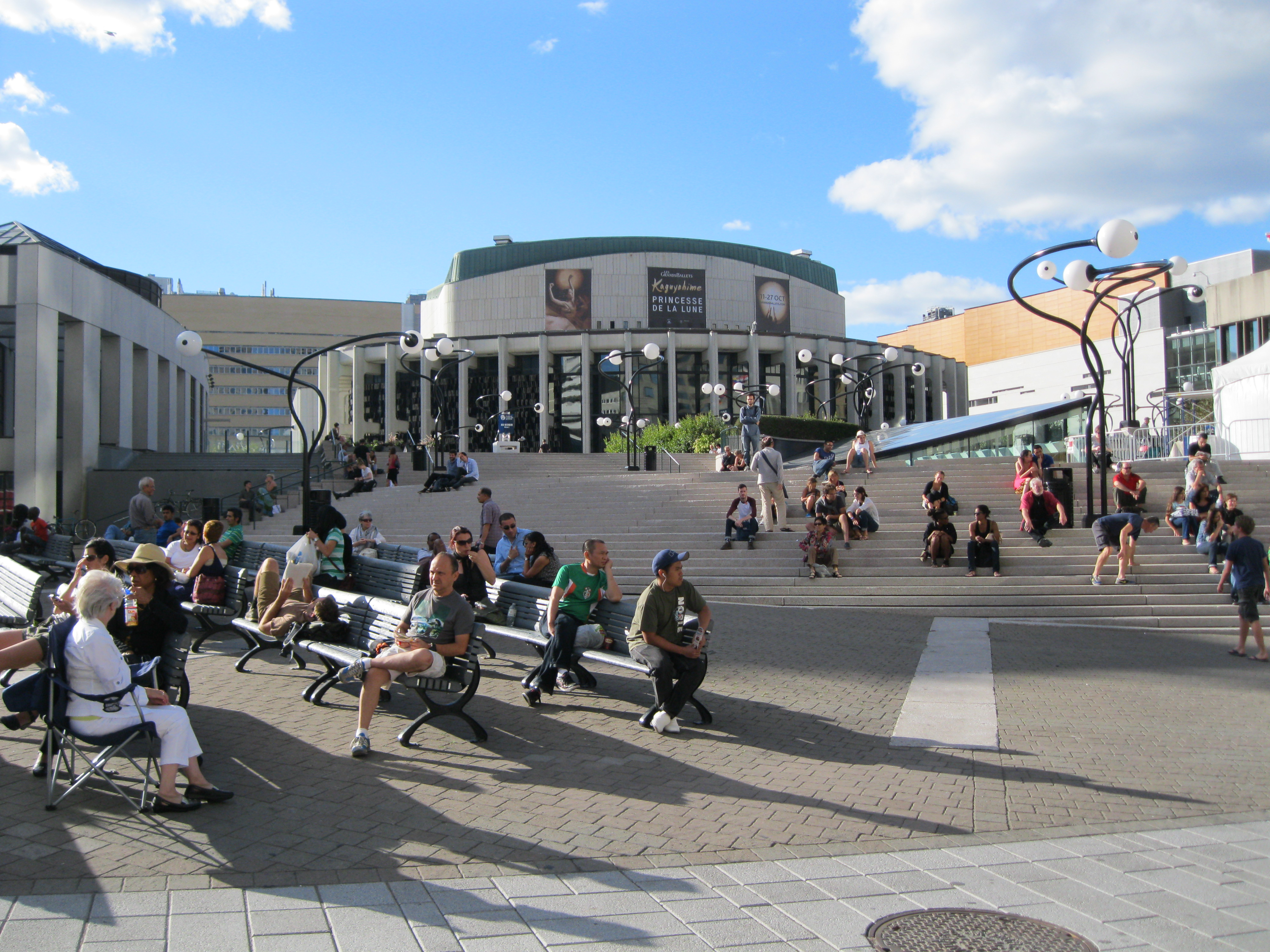
- Interactive map of Salle Wilfrid-Pelletier
- Former names: Grande Salle
- Address: 175 Rue Sainte-Catherine Ouest
- Location: Montreal, Quebec, Canada
- Coordinates: 45°30′31.7″N 73°34′02.6″W
- Capacity: 2,996

Construction
- Opened: September 21, 1963
- Architects: Hazen Sise; Dimitri Dimakopoulos; Fred Lebensold

Salle Wilfrid-Pelletier is a large multipurpose venue in Montreal, Quebec equipped with sophisticated technical equipment. It seats 2,996 people and is part of the Place des Arts cultural complex in Montréal's Quartier des Spectacles entertainment district. It is the largest multipurpose stage in Canada.

It is the home of the Opéra de Montréal, Les Grands Ballets Canadiens, and hosts concerts during the Montreal International Jazz Festival.

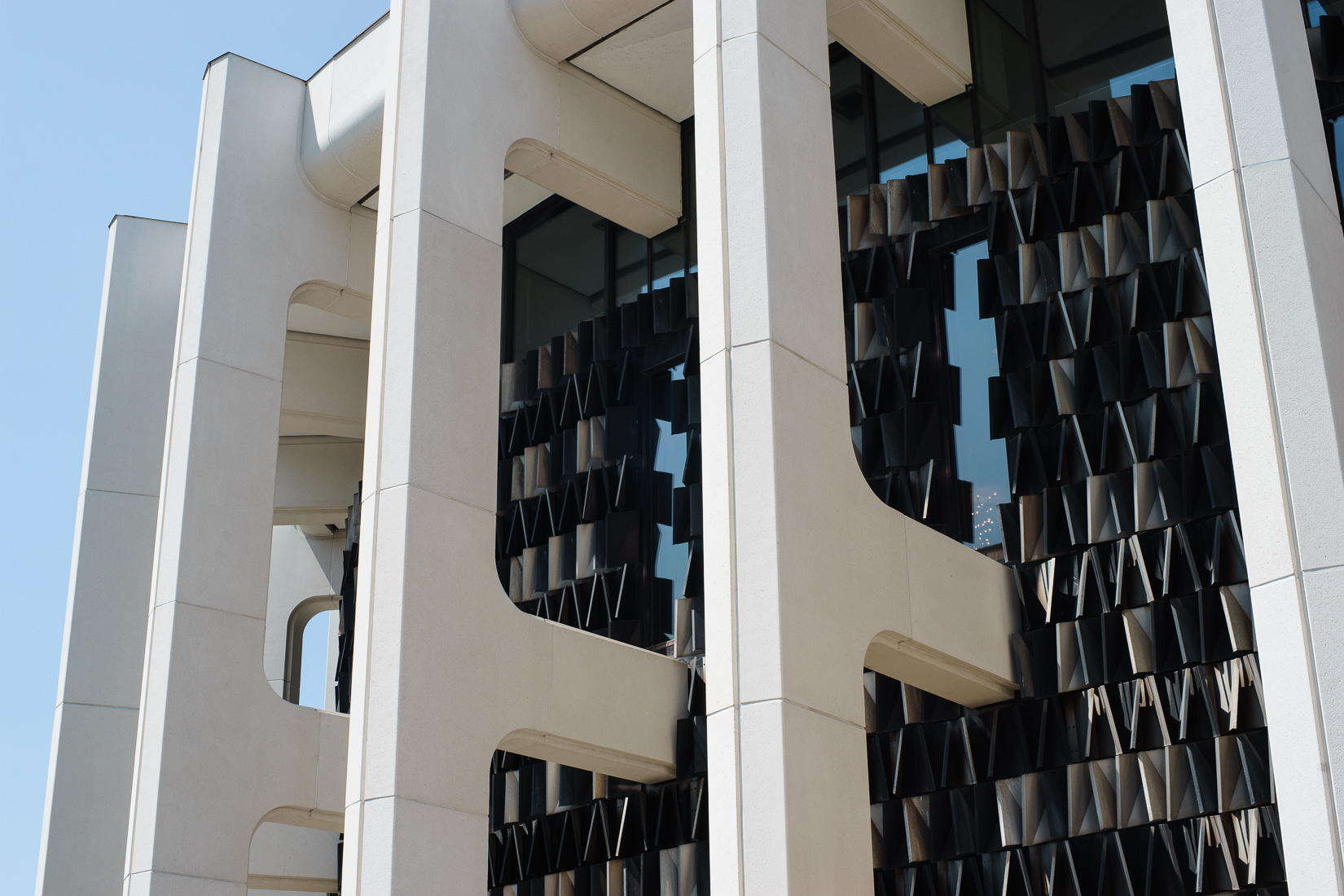
Salle Wilfrid-Pelletier, architectural details.

Built in 1963 by Hazen Sise, Dimitri Dimakopoulos and Fred Lebensold (of the Montréal architectural partnership Arcop), the theatre was initially called the Grande Salle before being named in honor of the famous head of the Montréal Symphony Orchestra, Wilfrid Pelletier. It is an adaptable venue for all the kinds of large-scale events, such as opera productions, comedy shows, and pop stars, but also including ballet, symphony orchestras, convocations, and Broadway musicals.
