= Bell Telephone Building (Montreal) =

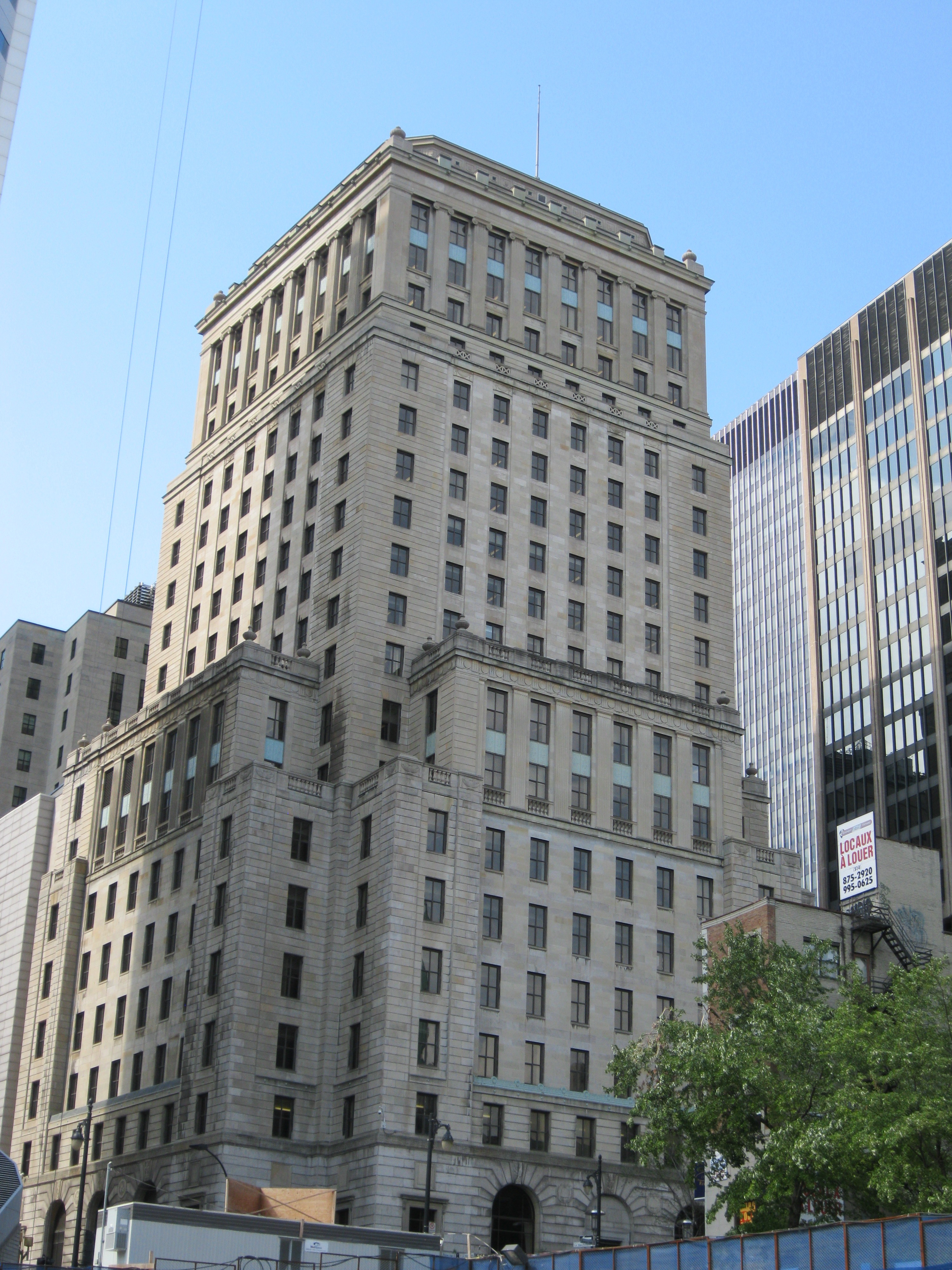
- Alternative names: Édifice Bell

General information
- Type: Commercial offices
- Location: 1050 Beaver Hall Hill; Montreal, Quebec
- Coordinates: 45.502273°N 73.564502°W
- Construction started: 1927
- Completed: 1929

Height
- Roof: 96 m (315 ft)

Technical details
- Floor count: 22
- Floor area: 237,782 ft^{2} (22,090.7 m^{2})

Design and construction
- Architect: Barott and Blackader

The Bell Telephone Building (French: Édifice Bell) is a neoclassical office building in Montreal, Quebec, Canada. It was constructed with a steel frame between 1927 and 1929. It has 22 floors and is 96 m (315 ft) tall. It once contained the head office for the Bell Telephone Company.

The Bell Telephone Building has 237,782 ft^{2} (22,090.7 m^{2}) of class B office space. It was renovated in 1980.

== Gallery ==
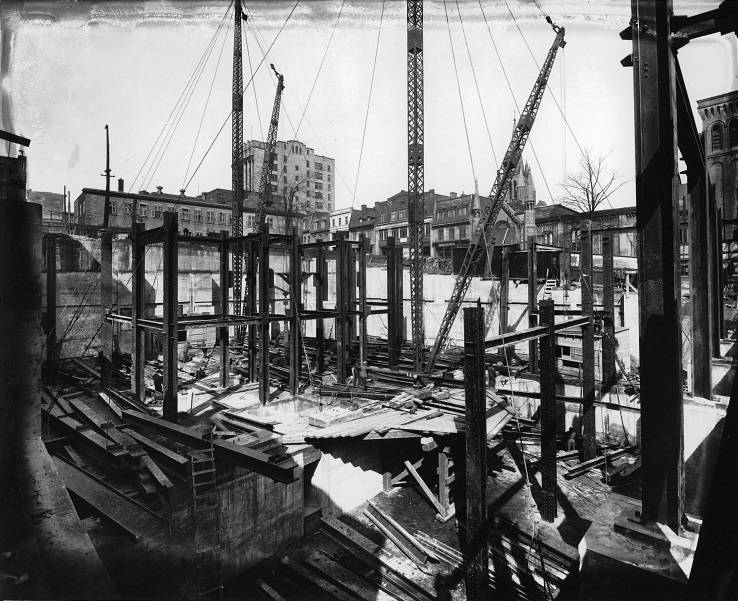
Construction of the building in 1928 ...

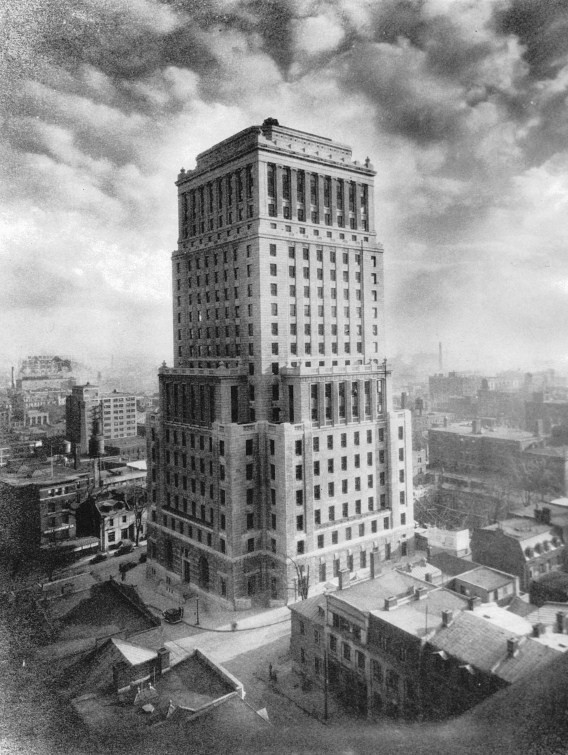
... and in 1931
