= Port Perry High School =

Public high school in Port Perry, Ontario, Canada

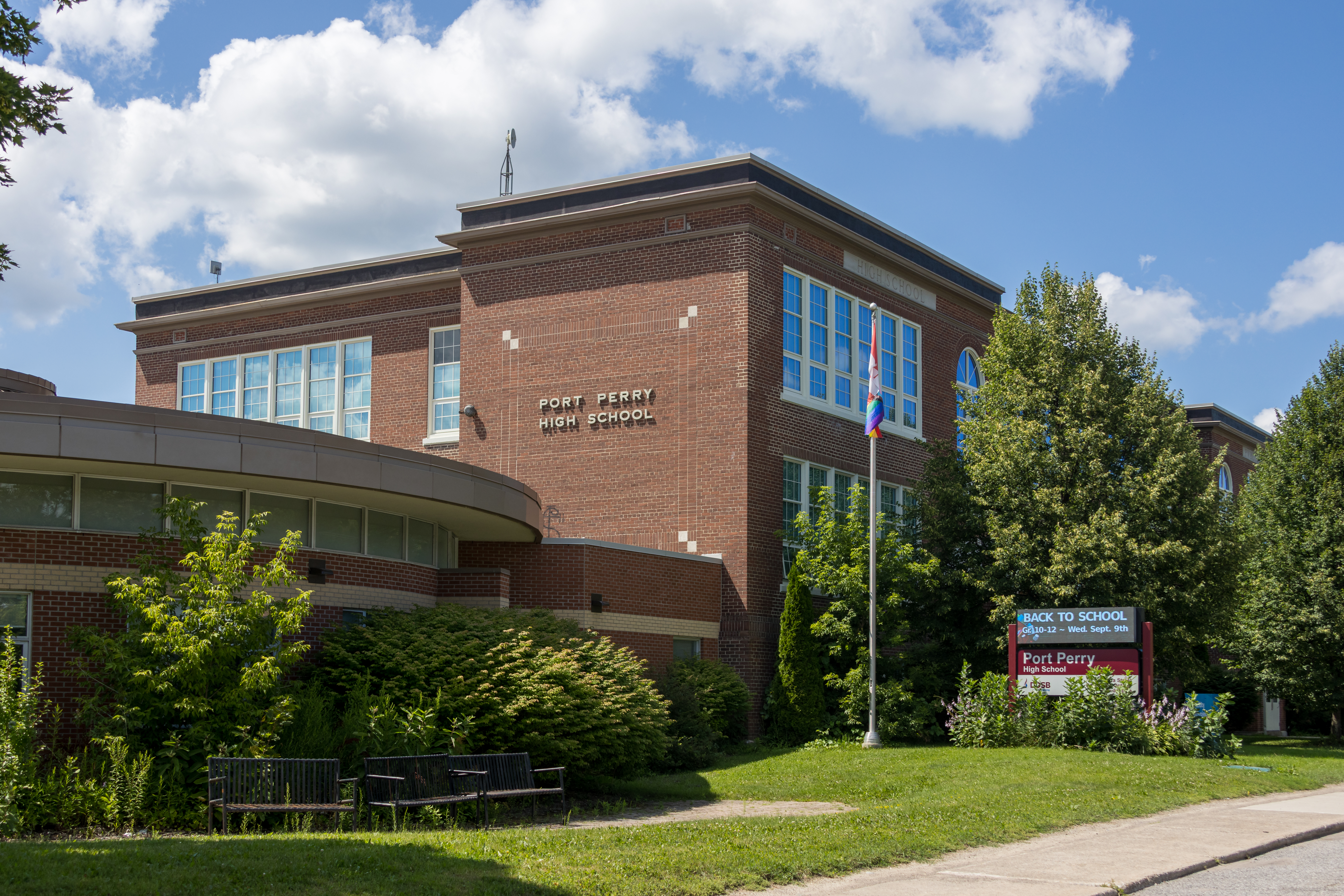
- Port Perry High School in 2026

Location
- Box 870, 160 Rosa Street; Port Perry, Ontario, L9L 1L7; Canada; 44.10286°N 78.95211°W

Information
- School type: Public
- Motto: "Ex Obscuritate Ad Lucem" trans. "Out of Darkness toward the Light"
- Founded: Grammar School, 1868; High School, 1871
- School board: Durham District School Board
- Superintendent: Erin Elmhurst
- Principal: Kim Stuart
- Grades: 9-12
- Enrolment: 910 (2021-2022)
- Language: English
- Colours: Red, Silver and Black
- Team name: Port Perry Rebels
- Website: www.ddsb.ca/school/portperryhs/Pages/default.aspx

Port Perry High School is a secondary school that serves students from grades 9 to 12 in Port Perry, Ontario.

== History ==
Some accounts suggest the intent to establish a high school in Port Perry dates to January, 1868, when James R. Youmans corresponded with the Chief Superintendent of Education for Upper Canada, Egerton Ryerson, regarding the appropriate textbooks required to conduct instruction of grammar school students. In September, 1868, Port Perry Grammar School opened in the second-floor room of the Common School located on Ottawa Street in Port Perry, with an enrolment of 24 boys and 2 girls. Between 1868 and 1873, enrolment fluctuated between 23 and 64 students, with a maximum of 6 girls during that period.

In 1871, as a result of "An Act to Improve the Common and Grammar Schools of Ontario", the name of the Grammar School was changed to Port Perry High School. In 1873, construction began on the Port Perry Union School, a facility that would house the Public and the High School in a single location. When the new building opened at the corner of Queen and Rosa Streets, 64 students were enrolled in the Classical and the English programs offered at the High School.

From 1874 to 1926, the population of the High School varied substantially, with a high of 127 students in 1880. Several Port Perry High School students fought in the Great War of 1914-18; ten students died in action during the war. A plaque was erected to honour them by the staff and students of PPHS in June, 1919. It was recently restored and is located at the south parking lot entrance of the school, outside the Library-Resource Centre. In April, 1926, a massive fired destroyed the 50-year-old structure. Lost in the flames were the entire archives of school records dating to the opening of the Grammar School in 1868 and the Common School of 1858. As well, generations of school photographs were not only lost, but probably stoked the fire that completely engulfed the school. The site of the building is commemorated by a plaque located on High School Hill, the park located at the corner of Queen and Rosa streets in Port Perry.

In May, 1927, a new facility for Port Perry Public and High School opened on Rosa Street, a few steps north of the Union School site. The new school featured 11 classrooms, six for the High School and five for the Public School. The building also featured a gymnasium (the Senior Developmental classroom is now located in this space), and an assembly hall (the Drama Room currently occupies this space). The cost of construction for the "New School" was $100,000.

Eight Port Perry High School students sacrificed their lives during the Second World War. A commemorative plaque in recognition of their valiant efforts also sits outside the school's Library-Resource Centre. Many of the High School's students contributed at home as well, working tirelessly on farms across Scugog and Reach Townships to contribute to the war effort.

By 1952, the cornerstone of a new Public School in Port Perry was laid on Queen Street, just west of Ottawa Street. The movement of public school students to what is now R.H. Cornish Public School opened several classrooms to students enrolled in the High School's programs. However, the existing school facility did not meet the needs of the community or of the growing enrolment Port Perry High School was experiencing. Under Principal Grant MacDonald's leadership, an aggressive expansion program brought a new wing north of the existing building (with a combined gymnasium/auditorium) in 1961 and a second addition which included a second smaller gymnasium, central offices, a cafeteria, classrooms and a full technical facility in 1967.

In 1998, a third phase of expansion brought a modern music education facility to PPHS (located in the old 1967 Library), and a brand new Library/Resource Centre was erected south of the 1927 building.

in 2012, a fourth phase of expansion brought a new Science wing south of the Library/Resource Centre. Port Perry High School also received new Outdoor Education, Cosmetology and Culinary facilities.

== Rebels athletics ==
PPHS offers Basketball, Badminton, Football, Hockey, Rugby, Wrestling, Volleyball, Golf, Soccer, Swimming, Tennis, Ultimate Frisbee, Track and Field and Cross Country. The Rebels compete in LOSSA (Lake Ontario Secondary School Athletics).

The Rebels Boys' senior rugby team won an OFSAA Championship in 1999 and an OFSAA Bronze Medals in 1997 and 2006. The Junior Boys' team earned a Barbarian Cup Silver Medal in 1996 and 1997. The Junior Girls' rugby team won a LASSO Gold Medal in both 2009 and 2010.

== Alumni ==
- Herbert Alexander Bruce, who graduated in 1885, was a World War I surgeon to the British Armies in France, a founder of Wellesley Hospital in Toronto, the Lieutenant-Governor of Ontario from 1932 to 1937, and the M.P for the riding of Toronto-Park dale from 1940 to 1946.
- Sir James Howden MacBrien, soldier and later Commissioner of the RCMP
- George Cope, 1981 (President and CEO, Bell Canada Enterprises).
- Vladimir Hachinski, 1968, a neurologist who is an international authority on stroke prevention. He was named a Member of the Order of Canada in 2008 "for his contributions to the field of neurology, notably as a clinician and researcher in the field of stroke and dementia."
- George Burnett attended the school as a student, later taught at the school, and coached the Edmonton Oilers.

== See also ==
- Education in Ontario
- List of secondary schools in Ontario
