= Charles Fleetford Sise Jr. =

American-born Canadian businessman

- Born: 9 October 1874; Boston, Massachusetts
- Died: 10 November 1960 (aged 86); Montreal, Quebec
- Education: McGill University (BSc 1897)
- Spouse: Eleanor Frances Scott (m. 1902)

Charles Fleetford Sise Jr. (7 October 1874 – 10 November 1960) was an American-born Canadian businessman and president of Bell Canada from March 25, 1925, to November 1, 1944.

Sise graduated from McGill University in 1897 with a degree in Electrical and Mechanical Engineering.

Sise was born in Boston in the United States on October 7, 1874. He died in Montreal on November 10, 1960 at the age of 86.

== See also ==
- Charles Fleetford Sise (father)
- Edward Fleetford Sise (brother)
- Paul Fleetford Sise (brother)
- Thomas Wardrope Eadie

Business positions
Preceded by Lewis Brown McFarlane	President of the Bell Telephone Company of Canada; 1925-1944	Succeeded by Frederick Johnson
