= Frederick Johnson (businessman) =

- Born: 4 May 1887; Southport, Lancashire
- Died: 14 May 1968 (aged 81); Montreal, Quebec
- Spouse: Georgina Victoria Robinson (m. 1910)

Frederick Johnson was a British-Canadian businessman and president of Bell Canada from 1944 to 1953 and chairman until 1960.

Business positions
Preceded by Charles Fleetford Sise Jr.	President of the Bell Telephone Company of Canada; 1944-1953	Succeeded by Thomas Wardrope Eadie
