= Marcel Vincent =

Canadian businessman (1907–1992)

- Born: 4 December 1907; Montreal, Quebec
- Died: 1 October 1992 (aged 84); Sainte-Anne-de-Bellevue, Quebec
- Education: Université de Montréal (MComm 1927)
- Spouse: Ginette Meriot (m. 1937)
- Military career
- Branch: Royal Canadian Navy
- Service years: 1939–1945
- Rank: Lieutenant Commander
- Conflicts: World War II

Marcel Vincent CC (4 December 1907 – 1 October 1992) was a Canadian businessman. He was the first French Canadian president of Bell Canada from August 1, 1963, to August 1, 1968. He was chairman and CEO from August 1, 1968, to December 31, 1972.

Born in Montreal, Quebec, Vincent graduated from the Université de Montréal (HEC Montréal) with a master's degree in commerce. He joined Bell Canada in 1927 and served in World War II in the navy from 1941 to 1945.

In 1972 he was made a Companion of the Order of Canada "for his contribution to the business community". The Association francophone pour le savoir (Acfas) Prix Marcel-Vincent is named in his honour.

Business positions
Preceded by Thomas Wardrope Eadie	President of the Bell Telephone Company of Canada; 1963-1968	Succeeded by Robert Carleton Scrivener
