= Bell Canada =

Canadian telecommunications company

- Formerly: The Bell Telephone Company of Canada, Ltd. (1880–1968)
- Type: Subsidiary
- Industry: Telecommunications
- Founded: April 29, 1880; 146 years ago
- Founders: Charles Fleetford Sise
- Headquarters: Verdun, Quebec, Canada
- Area served: Canada
- Key people: Mirko Bibic (CEO)
- Products: Fixed line; mobile telephony; Internet services; Digital television; Radio broadcasting
- Revenue: ▲CA$24.47 billion (2025)
- Operating income: ▲CA$10.67 billion (2025)
- Net income: ▲CA$6.51 billion (2025)
- Total assets: ▲CA$80.17 billion (2025)
- Total equity: ▲CA$23.31 billion (2025)
- Number of employees: ▼38,683 (2025)
- Parent: American Bell (1880–1899); AT&T Corporation (1899–1975); BCE Inc. (1983–present)
- Subsidiaries: Bell Technical Solutions; Bell Mobility; Bell Aliant; Bell MTS; Virgin Plus; Bell Internet; Bell Satellite TV; Bell Fibe TV; Lucky Mobile; EBOX; Bell Fund; Ziply Fiber
- ASN: 577
- Website: www.bell.ca

Bell Canada (commonly referred to as Bell) is a Canadian telecommunications company headquartered at 1 Carrefour Alexander-Graham-Bell in the borough of Verdun, Quebec, Canada. It is an ILEC (incumbent local exchange carrier) in the provinces of Ontario and Quebec; as such, it was a founding member of the Stentor Alliance. It is also a CLEC (competitive local exchange carrier) for enterprise customers in the western provinces.

Its subsidiary Bell Aliant provides services in the Atlantic provinces. It provides mobile service through its Bell Mobility (including flanker brand Virgin Plus) subsidiary, and television through its Bell Satellite TV (direct broadcast satellite) and Bell Fibe TV (IPTV) subsidiaries.

Bell Canada's principal competitors are: Rogers Communications in Ontario and Western Canada, Telus Communications in Quebec and Western Canada, Quebecor (Videotron) in Quebec plus other Global Wireless Infrastructure Providers such as American Tower. The company serves over 13 million phone lines and is headquartered at the Campus Bell complex in the borough of Verdun in Montreal.

Bell Canada is one of the main assets of the holding company BCE Inc., an abbreviation of its full name, Bell Canada Enterprises. In addition to the Bell Canada telecommunications properties, BCE also owns Bell Media (which operates mass media properties including the national CTV Television Network) and holds a minority interest in the Montreal Canadiens ice hockey club. BCE ranked number 301 on the 2021 edition of the Forbes Global 2000 list.

== History ==
Historically, Bell Canada has been one of Canada's most important and most powerful companies and, in 1975, was listed as the fifth largest in the country. The company is named after the inventor of the telephone, Alexander Graham Bell, who also co-founded Bell Telephone Company in Boston, Massachusetts. Bell Canada operated as the Canadian subsidiary of the Bell System from 1880 to 1975. However, unlike the other regional Bell operating companies, Bell Canada had its own research and development labs.

=== Inception ===
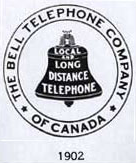
Canadian Bell logo, 1902–1922. Note the USA-oriented stars used in other Bell System trademarks.

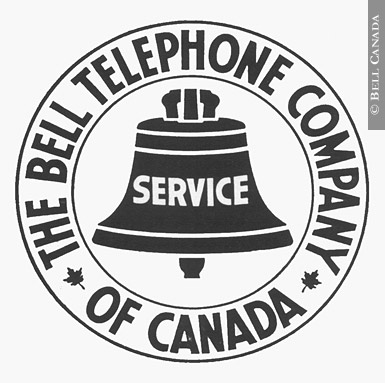
The Bell Telephone Company of Canada logo, 1922–1940. Note the Canada-oriented maple leaves.

In the mid-1870s, Alexander Graham Bell, who was Scottish-born but lived in Canada, invented an analogue electromagnetic telecommunication device that could simultaneously transmit and receive human speech. In March 1876 he successfully patented his invention in the United States under the title of "Improvement In Telegraphy" (U.S. patent 174,465). His device later adopted the name now used worldwide, the telephone. Bell also patented it in Canada and transferred 75% of the Canadian patent rights to his father, Alexander Melville Bell, with the remaining 25% being awarded to Boston telephone manufacturer Charles Williams Jr. in exchange for 1,000 telephones to be provided to the Canadian market. This order could not be fulfilled due to surging demand in the United States.

For a few years, the senior Bell and his friend and business associate Reverend Thomas Philip Henderson collected royalties from the lease of telephones to customers in the limited late-1870s Canadian market, who either operated their own private telephone lines or subscribed to a third party telecommunications service provider.

In 1879, Bell's father sold his Canadian rights to the National Bell Telephone Company, formed in Boston, Massachusetts earlier that year by the merger of the Bell Telephone Company and the New England Telephone and Telegraph Company, which in 1880 reorganized as the American Bell Telephone Company, initiating the Bell System. That same year the Canadian division was renamed to "The Bell Telephone Company of Canada Ltd.", eventually to be headed by U.S. executive Charles Fleetford Sise from Chicago who served as its first general manager.

The first supplier of telephones to Bell was a company established by Thomas C. Cowherd and his son James H. Cowherd, in a three-storey brick building in Brantford, Ontario, creating Canada's first telephone factory. (Note: Bell had originally asked Boston manufacturer Charles Williams Jr. to provide an initial order of 1,000 telephones for use in Canada in exchange for a 25% interest in the telephone's Canadian patent rights, but Williams' small shop was only able to produce a fraction of that number. Bell then spoke with a Brantford friend, James Cowherd (1849? – Feb. 1881), who established Canada's first telephone factory, producing 2,398 telephones to Bell's specifications by 1881. Cowherd had been sent by Bell to Boston in 1878 to study Williams manufacturing processes for a number of months, and then returned to Brantford to both produce and further develop Bell's telephone models. The Brantford plant's first shipment of 19 telephones to Hamilton was made the same year on December 23, 1878. Among Cowherd's designs was a transmitter fitted with a triple mouthpiece allowing three people to talk, and sing, simultaneously. James Cowherd's untimely early death due to tuberculosis was noted in major technical journals and led to the closure of the Bell Systems' manufacturing supplier in Brantford. Telephone production later resumed in Montreal, eventually leading to the creation of Northern Electric in 1895, later renamed Northern Telecom and then Nortel. A Brantford Expositor article later noted of the historic factory building's demise: "[In 1992 Brantford] City officials and heritage committee members... learned that a building that once housed the first telephone factory in the world had been approved for demolition. The embarrassing oversight came to light too late to stop wrecking crews, who were already tearing down the aged building at 32 Wharfe St.... The building, where equipment for Alexander Graham Bell's first telephone was made, had even been pictured and written about in a city-printed brochure about the great inventor. A plaque erected by [the] Telephone Pioneers of America heralding the building's significance had been stripped from the structure in the mid-1980s and given to the Brant County Museum".) Thomas and James had been good friends of Alexander Graham Bell, providing stovepipe wire with which Bell conducted his early telephone experiments from his father's home in Tutelo Heights, Ontario, and also building some 2,398 telephones to Bell's specifications for the Canadian market until James Cowherd's untimely death from tuberculosis in 1881. With a government-granted monopoly on Canadian long-distance telephone service, The Bell Telephone Company of Canada was serving 237,000 subscribers by 1914.

Since its early years The Bell Telephone Company of Canada, Ltd. had been known colloquially as "The Bell" or "Bell Telephone". On March 7, 1968, Canadian federal legislation renamed The Bell Telephone Company of Canada, Ltd. to Bell Canada.

=== Competition and territory reduction ===
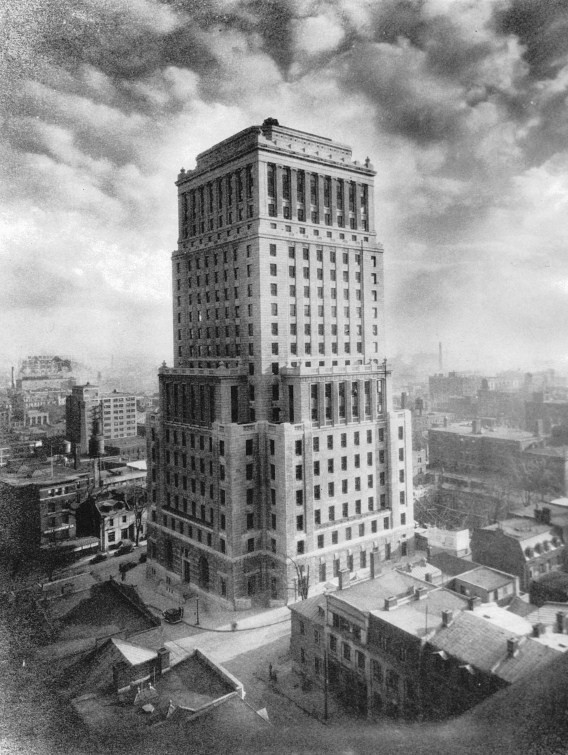
The Bell Telephone Building in Montreal was once the head office of Bell Canada.

Bell Canada extended lines from Nova Scotia to the foot of the Rocky Mountains in what is now Alberta. However, most of the attention given to meeting demand for service focused on major cities in Ontario, Quebec, and the Maritime Provinces.

==== Atlantic Canada ====
During the late 19th century, Bell sold its Atlantic operations in the three Maritime provinces, where many small independent companies also operated and eventually came under the ownership of three provincial companies. Newfoundland and Labrador joined Canada with several private companies, and a government operation that was transferred to the control of Canadian National Railways.

Bell acquired interests in all Atlantic companies during the early 1960s, starting with Newfoundland Telephone (which later was organized as NewTel Communications) on July 24, 1962. Bell acquired controlling interest in Maritime Telephone and Telegraph Company, later known as MT&T, which also owned PEI-based Island Telephone, and in Bruncorp, the parent company of NBTel in 1966. The purchase of MT&T was made despite efforts of the Nova Scotia legislature on September 10, 1966, to limit the voting power of any shareholder to 1000 votes. Bell-owned MT&T absorbed some 120 independent companies, most serving fewer than 50 customers each. Bell-owned NewTel purchased the CNR-owned Terra Nova Tel in 1988.

In the late 1990s, Newtel, Bruncorp, MT&T and Island Tel merged into Aliant, now Bell Aliant which owns many services in rural areas of Ontario and Quebec formerly owned by Bell Canada.

On January 1, 2011, Bell acquired xwave from Bell Aliant for $40 million, an information technology company offering sales and services in Atlantic Canada.

==== Quebec and Ontario ====
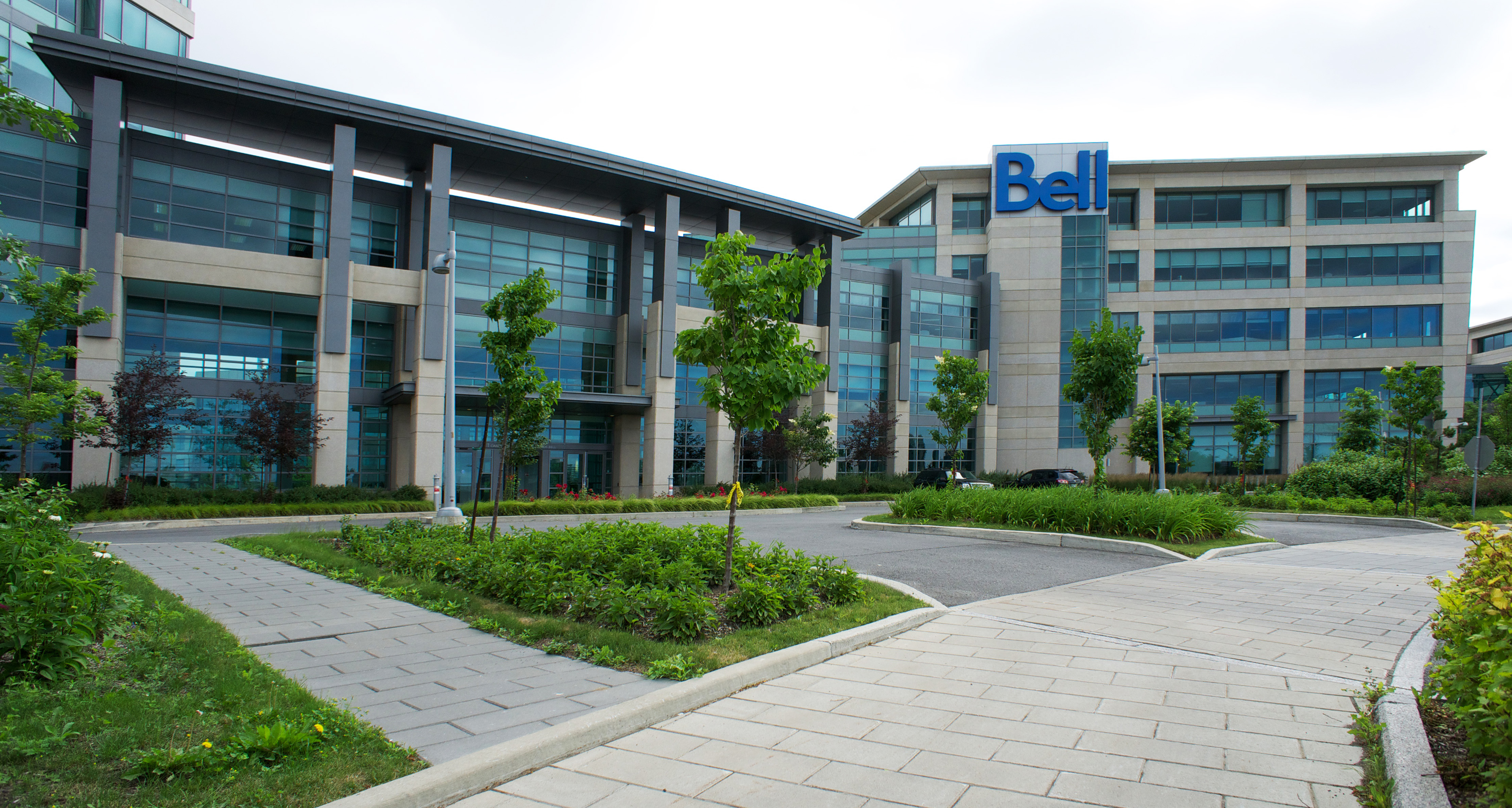
Bell Canada's headquarters located on Nuns' Island in Montreal, Quebec

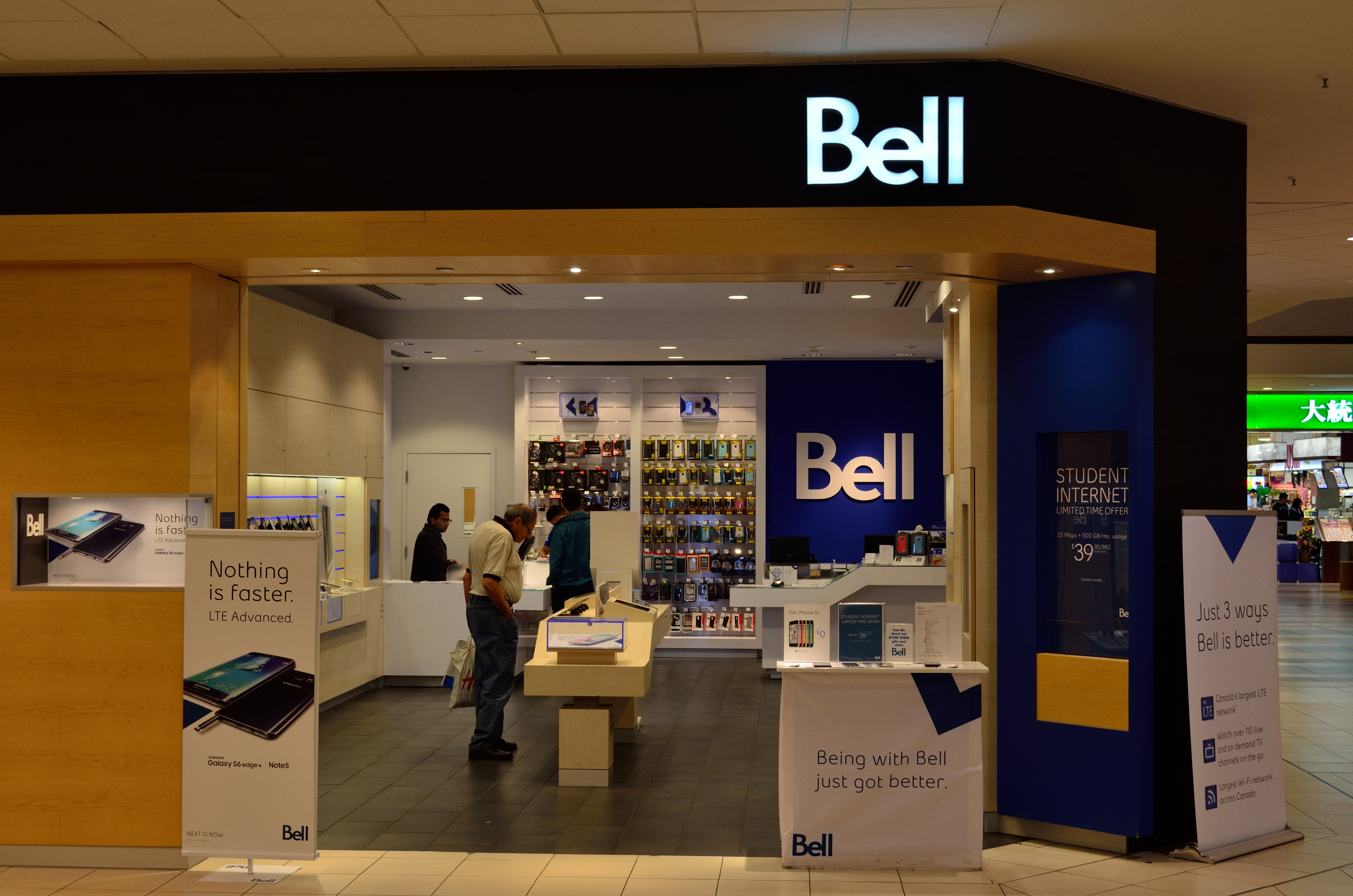
A Bell Store in The Promenade Shopping Centre, Thornhill, Ontario

Independent companies appeared in many areas of Ontario, Quebec and Maritime provinces without adequate Bell Canada service. During the 20th century Bell acquired most of the independent companies in Ontario and Quebec, most notably the purchase of Nexxlink Technologies, a Montreal-based integrated IT solutions and telecommunications provider founded by Karol Brassard. Alongside the acquisition of Charon Systems, Nexxlink now operates today as Bell Business Solutions—a division of Bell Canada. Quebec, however, still has large swaths of relatively rural areas served by Telus Québec (formerly Québec Telephone, later acquired by Telus Communications) and Télébec (now owned by Bell Canada via Bell Aliant) and by some 20 small independent companies. As of 1980, Ontario still had some 30 independent companies, and Bell has not acquired any; the smaller ones were sold to larger independents with larger capital resources. Cellcom Communications is the largest franchisee of Bell Canada, currently operating 25 Bell stores in both Québec and Ontario regions.

==== Alberta, Manitoba and Saskatchewan ====
At separate times, the three Prairie provinces acquired Bell Canada operations and formed provincial utility services, investing to develop proper telephone services throughout those provinces; Bell Canada's investment in the prairies had been scant or insufficient relative to growth, and all three had various local telephone companies. The Alberta government's Alberta Government Telephones Commission and Manitoba Government Telephones purchased the Bell operations of their provinces in 1908. Saskatchewan's Department of Railways, Telegraphs and Telephones, established in June 1908, purchased the Bell operations on October 1, 1909; all three provinces' government operations eventually acquired the independent companies.

Having achieved a high level of development, Manitoba moved to privatize its telephone utility and Alberta privatized Alberta Government Telephones to create Telus Communications in the 1990s. Saskatchewan continues to own SaskTel as a crown corporation. Edmonton was served by a city-owned utility, Edmonton Telephones Corporation, that was sold to Telus in 1995. BCE re-gained ownership of the Manitoba system, now known as Bell MTS, on March 17, 2017.

==== British Columbia ====
British Columbia, served today by Telus Communications, was served by numerous small companies that mostly amalgamated to form British Columbia Telephone, later known as BC Tel (the last known acquisition was the Okanagan Telephone Company in the late 1970s), which served the province from the 1960s until its merger with Telus. (The amalgamations produced one anomaly: Atlin is surrounded by the territory of Northwestel, implying that the company that established service there was acquired by a company serving territories further south.)

==== Northern Canada ====
Although Bell Canada entered the Northwest Territories (NWT) with an exchange at Iqaluit (then known as Frobisher Bay, in the territory now known as Nunavut) in 1958, Canadian National Telecommunications, a subsidiary of Canadian National Railways (CNR), provided most of the telephone service in Canada's northern territories (specifically, Yukon, northern BC and the western NWT). CNR created Northwestel in 1979, and Bell Canada Enterprises acquired the company in 1988 as a wholly owned subsidiary. Bell Canada sold its 22 exchanges in the eastern region of the NWT to Northwestel in 1992, and BCE transferred ownership of the company to Bell Canada in 1999. Northwestel's operating area was in 2001 opened to long-distance competition (which has materialized only in the form of prepaid card business, and service to large national customers with some operating locations in the north) and in 2007 to resale of local telephone service (which has not yet occurred).

Northern British Columbia, northeastern Ontario and the James Bay region of northern Quebec were served by independent companies, though Bell Canada eventually provided service in more far-flung reaches of Ontario and Quebec, acquired ownership interests in companies serving large swaths of northwestern Quebec and northeastern Ontario, and in Northwestel.

=== Divestiture and deregulation ===
The Bell System had two main companies in the telephone industry in Canada: Bell Canada as a regional operating company (affiliated with AT&T, with an ownership stake of approximately 39%) and Northern Electric as an equipment manufacturer (affiliated with Western Electric, with an ownership stake of approximately 44%). The Bell Telephone Company of Canada and Northern Electric were structured similarly in Canada to the analogous portions of the Bell System in the United States; the regional operating company (Bell Canada) sold telephone services as a local exchange carrier, and Western Electric (Northern Electric) designed and manufactured telephone equipment.

As part of the consent decree signed in 1956 to resolve the antitrust lawsuit filed in 1949 by the United States Department of Justice, AT&T and the Bell System proper divested itself of Northern Electric in 1956.

In October 1973, AT&T and Bell Canada signed an agreement stating that AT&T would no longer furnish Bell System communications and research to Bell Canada. AT&T's at-the-time chairman John DeButts explained that the main reason for this was because Bell Canada had developed its own research and development lab (Bell-Northern Research), making Bell Canada ready to serve its Canadian landline customers on its own. As a result, AT&T divested Bell Canada on June 30, 1975.

Bell Canada logo used from 1977 until January 1, 1995

Even though Bell Canada had been divested, it was allowed to participate in Bell System projects which could be completed shortly after its divestiture date.

Northern Electric renamed itself Northern Telecom in 1976, which in turn became Nortel Networks in 1998 with the acquisition of Bay Networks.

Bell Canada acquired 100 percent of Northern Electric in 1964; starting in 1973, Bell's ownership stake in Northern Electric was diminished through public stock offerings, though it retained majority control. In 1983, as a result of deregulation, Bell Canada Enterprises (later shortened to BCE) was formed as the parent company to Bell Canada and Northern Telecom. As a result of the stock transaction used by Northern Telecom to purchase Bay Networks, BCE ceased to be the majority owner of Nortel, and in 2000, BCE spun out its share of Nortel, distributing its holdings to its shareholders.

Between 1980 and 1997, the federal government fully deregulated the telecommunications industry and Bell Canada's monopoly largely ended. Bell Canada currently provides local phone service only in major city centres in Ontario and Quebec.

In July 2006, Bell and former subsidiary Aliant completed a restructuring whereby Aliant, renamed Bell Aliant Regional Communications, took over Bell's wireline operations in much of Ontario and Quebec (while continuing to use the "Bell" name in those regions), as well as its 63% ownership in rural lines operator Bell Nordiq (a publicly traded income trust that controls NorthernTel and Télébec). These are in addition to Bell Aliant's operations in Atlantic Canada. In turn, Bell has assumed responsibility for Bell Aliant's wireless and retail operations. Bell Aliant, now an income trust, is 44% owned by Bell.

On April 30, 2007, the Canadian Radio-television and Telecommunications Commission (CRTC) announced its decision to allow pay phone rates for Bell Canada, Telus, Bell Aliant, SaskTel, and MTS Allstream to increase from 25 cents to 50 cents, starting as early as June 1. The CRTC also permitted local rural rates to increase by the lesser of the annual rate of inflation or five percent, and removed price caps on optional rural services, such as call display and voicemail. On June 2, 2007, Bell Canada increased the cost of a local pay phone call to 50 cents when paid in cash and one dollar when paid by calling card or credit card, Bell's first increase in pay phone rates since 1981.

In 2009, Bell Canada purchased electronics retailer The Source and all other assets of InterTAN Canada Ltd. from bankrupt Circuit City.

Bell has deployed MPLS on their nationwide fibre ring network to support consumer and enterprise-level IP applications, such as IPTV and VoIP.

On March 17, 2017, BCE Inc. completed its acquisition of Manitoba Telecom Services.

== Criticism ==
Bell Canada has faced controversy and scandal. In late 2011, Bell Canada admitted to a policy of bandwidth throttling of BitTorrent traffic across its network when it announced it would stop the practice of "traffic shaping" during periods of high demand beginning in March 2012. In November 2011, only a few weeks before, the CRTC issued a ruling that stopped the controversial practice of usage-based billing of smaller internet service providers who purchase space on Bell Canada networks, providing a fee structure based on total capacity needed. Bell Canada had originally wanted to charge providers by how much data each user downloaded.

In May 2017, the email addresses of 1.9 million Bell customers were stolen, along with the name and phone numbers of 1.7 million customers. Then in January 2018, there was another data breach affecting about 100 thousand Bell customers.

Bell Canada's mobile phone services has been criticized for monopolistic practices, including during its acquisition of MTS.

== Services ==
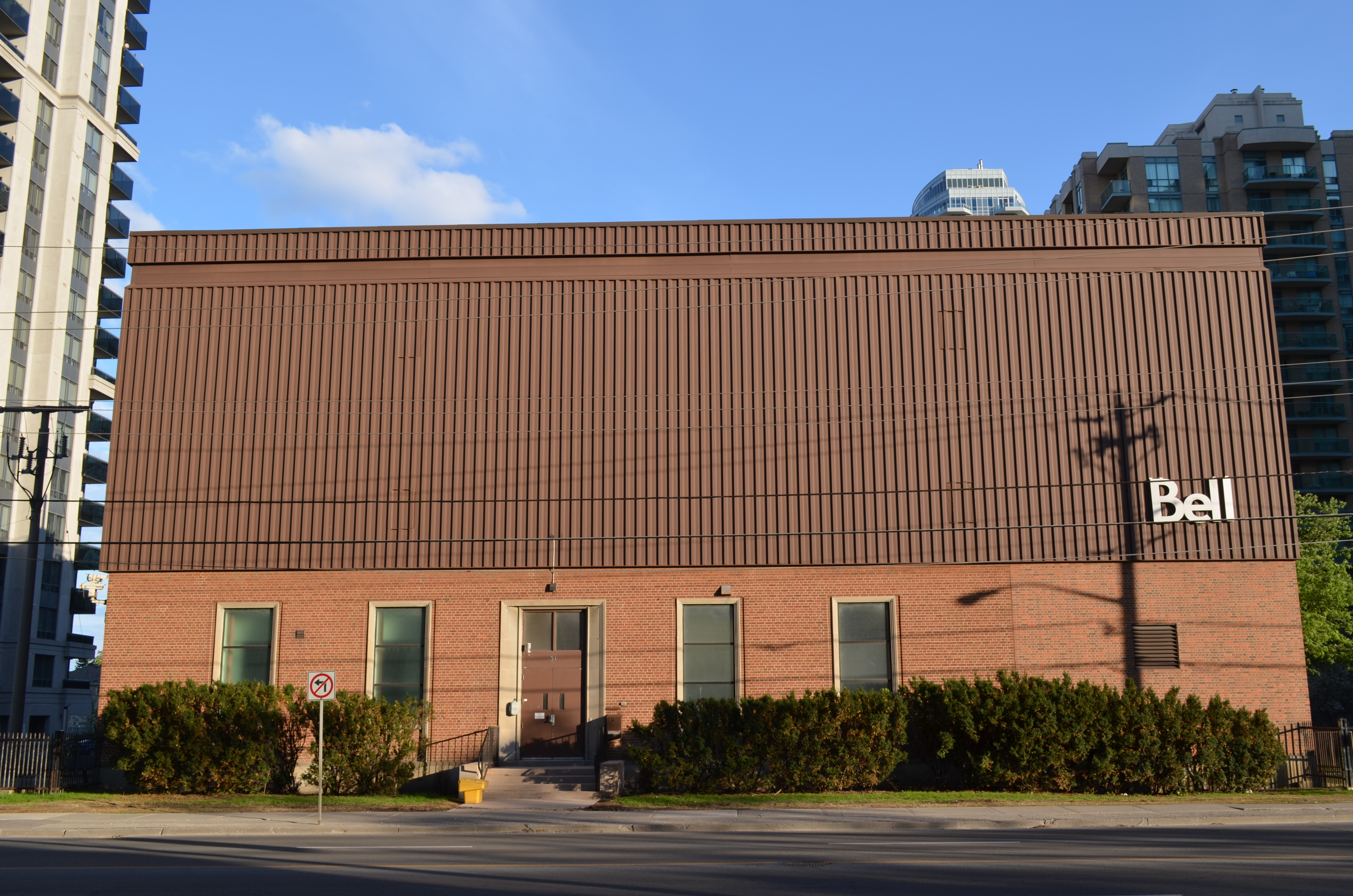
A Bell Central Office in Toronto

Bell Canada provides many different types of telecommunications services.

=== Voice ===
Bell Canada provides standard voice service. It used to offer VoIP to customers, branded as "Digital Voice". Businesses can still obtain VoIP service. It now offers BTC (Bell Total Connect) SIP service as a digital voice package.

=== Voicemail ===
Bell Home Phone and Bell Mobility provide voicemail service as an optional feature for residences and businesses. Bell Prepaid customers, however, receive a basic voice mail at no additional charge. The complimentary voice mail can store five messages of one minute each, for up to five days.

=== Wireless ===
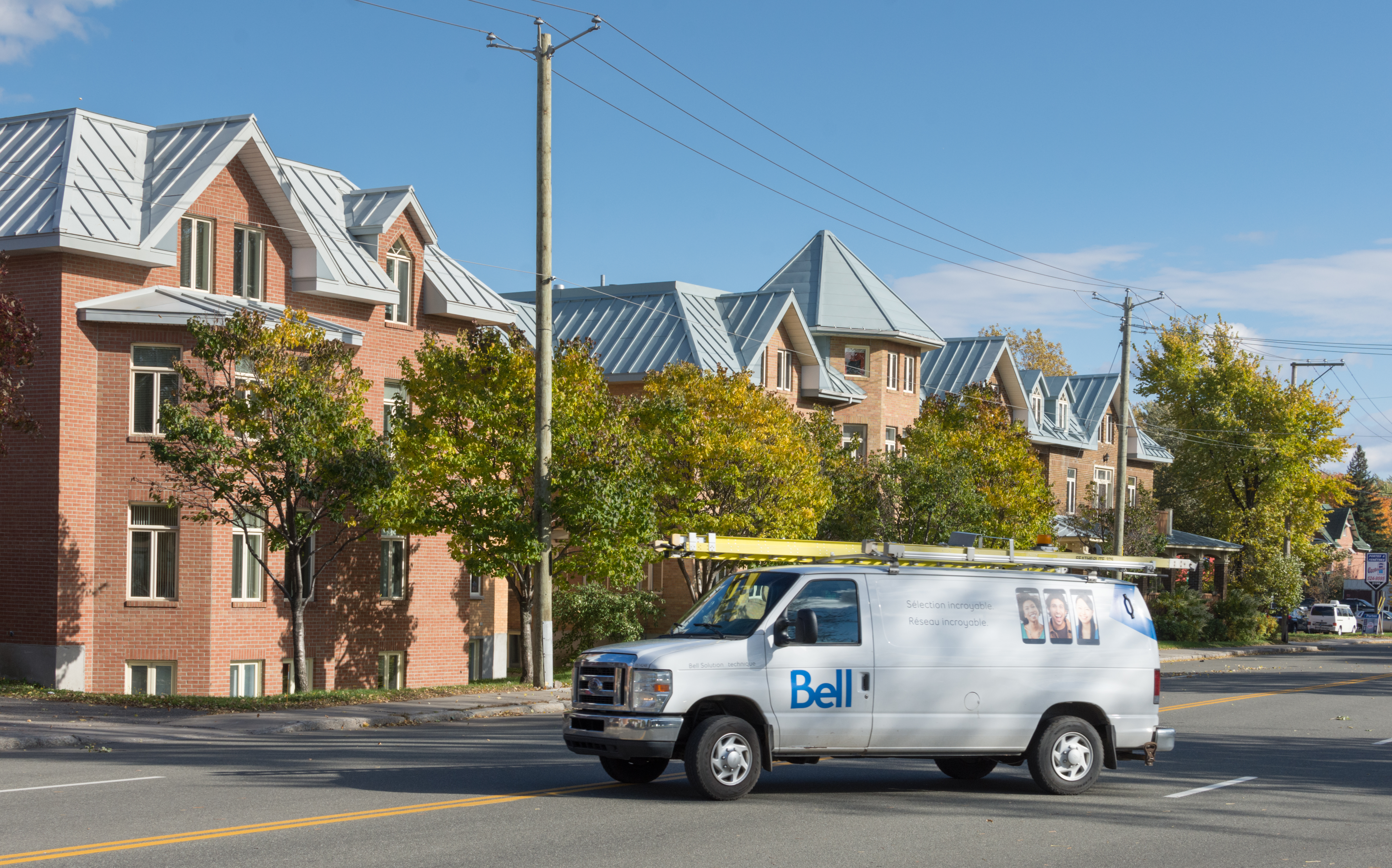
Bell Mobility van

Bell Mobility operates a cellular network in all Canadian provinces. It also owns Virgin Mobile Canada as of May 2009. While it created the Solo Mobile brand in 1999, Bell shut down all standalone Solo stores in 2011 while discontinuing third-party sales of all Solo phones in November 2011. The brand continues to be active for its current customers, but there are no incentives to encourage new subscriptions.

=== Television ===
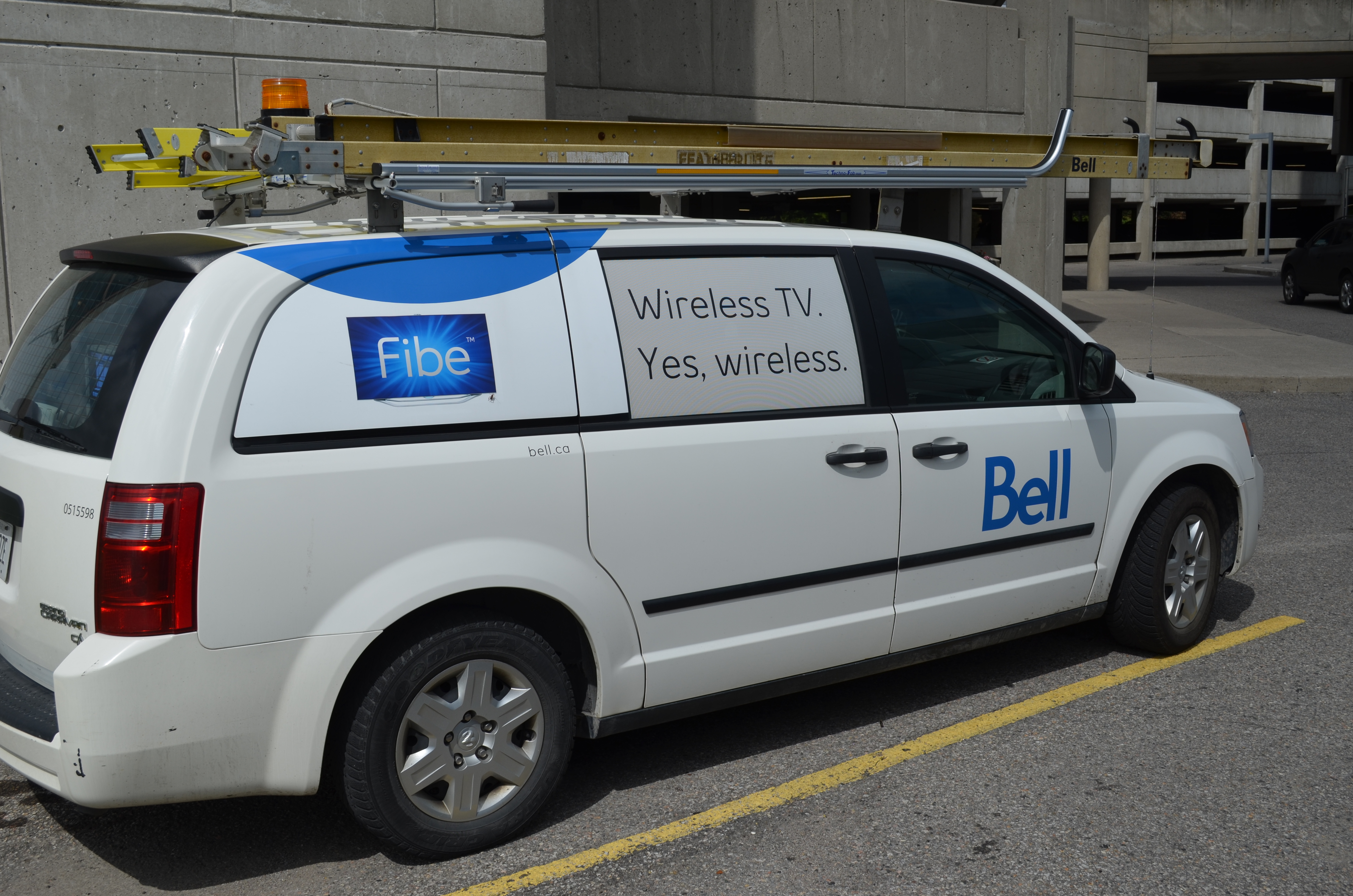
A Bell Fibe Van

Formerly known as ExpressVu, Bell Satellite TV is a satellite television service provider. There is also a mobile TV service, Bell Mobile TV, and a locked IPTV service known as Bell Fibe TV and Alt TV. The latter is available in most of Alberta, British Columbia, the Greater Toronto Area, Ottawa, Montreal, Québec City and Atlantic Canada.

=== Internet ===
Bell Internet provides high speed DSL and fibre to the home FTTH Internet service in many areas where it offers phone service. DSL is offered in various speeds ranging from 500 kbit/s to 100 Mbit/s download and 256 kbit/s to 10 Mbit/s upload on DSL while up to 8 Gbit/s on fibre optic depending on what the local infrastructure can support.

Bell began offering Fibre-to-the-node Internet access to some subscribers in 2010. Bell markets this service under the name "Fibe". Many urban Fibe regions can access all speeds up to and including 50+mbps down and 15+mbps up but some rural Fibe regions can only obtain 16 Mbit/s down and 1 Mbit/s up. Non-Fibe regions are limited to legacy DSL technology, supporting speeds of up to 7 Mbit/s down and 1 Mbit/s up. Bell Canada has now rolled out Fibre to the Home services to certain subscribers across Eastern Canada, this service can provide guaranteed download of 3 Gbit/s and upload speeds of 3 Gbit/s. In August 2019, the company announced it would cut roughly 200,000 households from a rural internet expansion program after a federal regulator lowered wholesale broadband prices that major telecom companies can charge smaller internet providers.

In a press release issued February 24, 2022, Bell announced that it has acquired Internet service provider EBOX. Bell wishes to keep the brand and the activities of EBOX and let the company continue to operate independently while remaining based in Longueuil.

=== Legacy ===
Bell previously offered Bell Home Monitoring, also known as Bell Gardium.

Bell Canada also previously offered cable television services in the United Kingdom via Bell Cablemedia plc (a joint venture with Jones Intercable and Cable & Wireless plc) from 1994 until 1997, when Vidéotron first sold its UK operations to Bell Cablemedia, after which Bell Cablemedia and the UK operations of NYNEX Corporation merged with Cable & Wireless plc to form Cable & Wireless Communications.

== Marketing ==
Bell Canada created the Frank and Gordon beavers to advertise its products from 2006 to 2008.

Coinciding with its advertising campaign as part of its sponsorship of the 2008 Beijing Olympics, Bell introduced a new logo and minimalist ad style, with the slogans "Today just got better" (with emphasis on the suffix "er") in English Canada and "La vie est Bell" (a pun on "La vie est Belle" — French: life is beautiful) in French Canada. The font used in Bell's marketing is a custom typeface known as 'Bell Slim', by Canadian typeface designer Ian Brignell.

== Historical financial performance ==
The financial performance of the company is reported to shareholders on an annual basis. The unit (except where noted) is millions of Canadian dollars.

Year	Revenue	Net Income	Total Assets	Employees
2010	▲18,069	▲2,165	▲39,276	▲50,200
2011	▲19,497	▲2,574	▲39,426	▲55,250
2012	▲19,975	▲3,053	▲40,968	▲55,500
2013	▲20,400	▼2,388	▲45,384	▲55,830
2014	▲21,042	▲2,718	▲46,297	▲57,234
2015	▲21,514	▲2,730	▲47,993	▼49,968
2016	▲21,719	▲3,087	▲50,108	▼48,090
2017	▲22,719	▼2,970	▲54,263	▲51,679
2018	▲23,468	▲2,973	▲57,100	▲52,790
2019	▲23,964	▲3,253	▲60,146	▼52,100
2020	▼22,883	▼2,699	▲60,665	▼50,704
2021	▲23,449	▲2,892	▲66,764	▼49,781
2022	▲24,174	▲2,926	▲69,329	▼44,610
2023	▲24,673	▼2,327	▲71,940	▲45,132
2024	▼24,409	▼375	▲73,485	▼40,390

== Leadership ==
=== President ===
1. Andrew Robertson, 1880–1890
2. Charles Fleetford Sise, 1890–1915
3. Lewis Brown McFarlane, 1915–1925
4. Charles Fleetford Sise, Jr., 1925–1944
5. Frederick Johnson, 1944–1953
6. Thomas Wardrope Eadie, 1953–1963
7. Marcel Vincent, 1963–1968
8. Robert Carlton Scrivener, 1968–1973
9. Albert Jean de Grandpré, 1973–1976
10. James Carden Thackray, 1976–1983
11. Joseph Victor Raymond Cyr, 1983–1986
12. Léonce Montambault, 1987–1989
13. Jean Claude Monty, 1989–1991
14. Robert Kearney, 1991–1993
15. John Thomas McLennan, 1994–1997
16. Ronald Walter Osborne, 1997–1998
17. John Alexander MacDonald, 1998–1999
18. John William Sheridan, 2000–2003
19. Michael John Sabia, 2000–2005
20. George Alexander Cope, 2005–2020
21. Mirko Bibic, 2020–present

=== Chairmen of the board ===
1. Lewis Brown McFarlane, 1925–1930
2. Charles Fleetford Sise, Jr., 1944–1953
3. Frederick Johnson, 1953–1957
4. Thomas Wardrope Eadie, 1957–1968
5. Marcel Vincent, 1968–1972
6. Robert Carlton Scrivener, 1973–1976
7. Albert Jean de Grandpré, 1976–1983
8. James Carden Thackray, 1983–1985
9. Joseph Victor Raymond Cyr, 1986–1996
10. Lynton Ronald Wilson, 1996–2026
11. Jean Claude Monty, –2002
12. Richard James Currie, 2002–2009
13. Thomas Charles O'Neill, 2009–2016
14. Gordon Melbourne Nixon, 2016–present

== See also ==
- American Telephone & Telegraph, AT&T, an earlier parent and successor to American Bell
- Bell Centre, a hockey arena in Montreal
- Bell Mobility, the division of Bell Canada which sells wireless services in Canada
- Bell System, the Bell Telephone / AT&T-led companies which provided phone services
- Bell Telephone Memorial, a large monument honouring the inventor in Brantford, Ontario
- Bell Tower, an office tower in Edmonton
- International Bell Telephone Company, the Bell Telephone's early European division
- List of largest companies by revenue
- List of public corporations by market capitalization
- List of telephone operating companies
- List of United States telephone companies
- National Bell Telephone Company, the very earliest parent company
- Place Bell, an office tower in Ottawa
- Telephone Pavilion (Expo 67), also known as the Bell Telephone Pavilion
- Thomas Cowherd, who helped establish Canada's first telephone factory
