= BCE Inc. =

Canadian telecommunications and media company

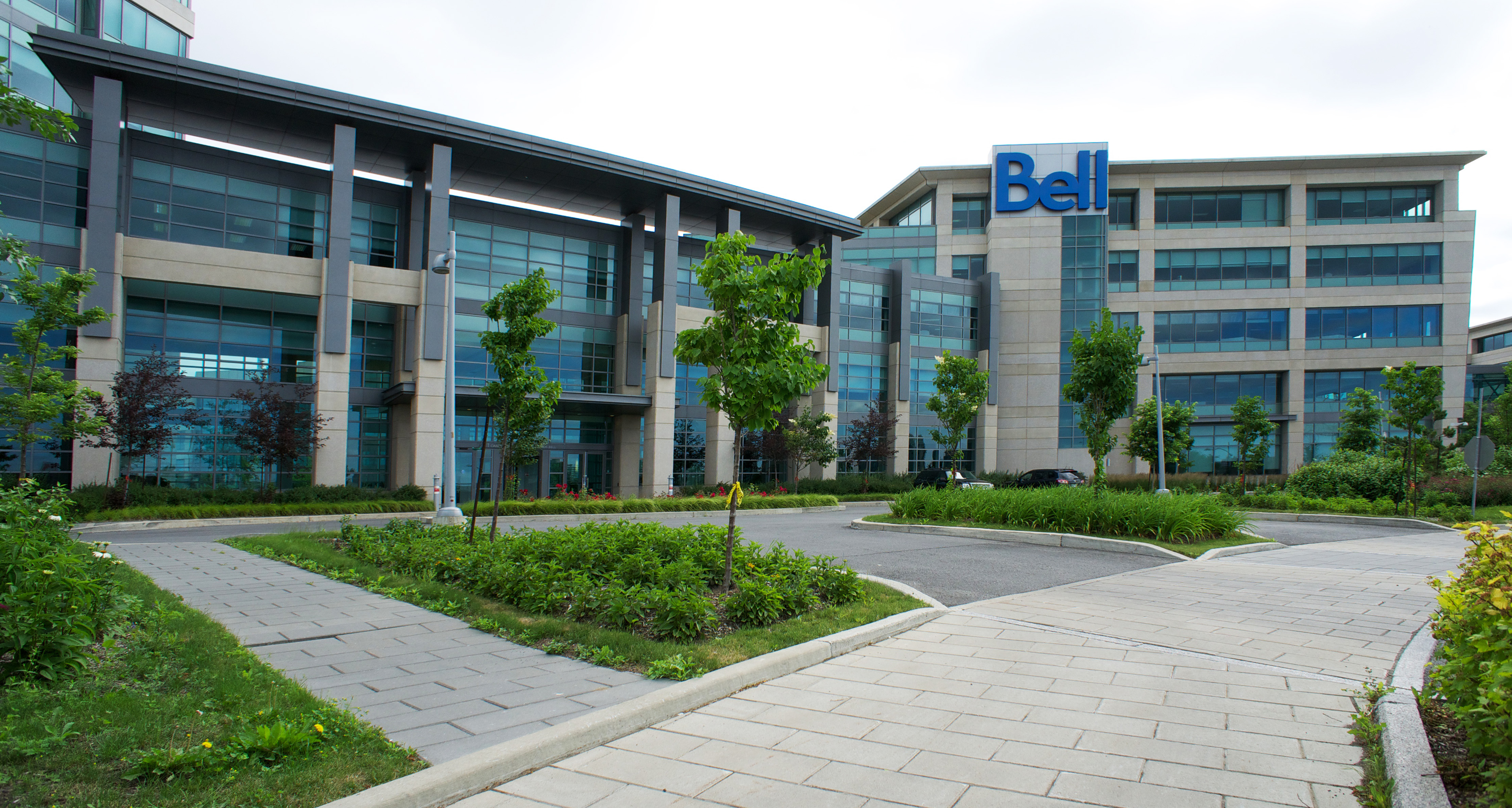
- Headquarters at Campus Bell in Verdun, Quebec
- Formerly: Bell Canada Enterprises Inc. (1983–1988)
- Type: Public
- Traded as: TSX: BCE; NYSE: BCE; S&P/TSX 60 component
- Industry: Telecommunications; Mass media
- Founded: 1983; 43 years ago
- Headquarters: Montreal, Quebec, Canada
- Key people: Mirko Bibic (president & CEO); Gordon Nixon (chair); Glen LeBlanc (CFO & vice chair, Atlantic Canada)
- Products: Fixed line and mobile telephony; Internet services; Digital television; Radio broadcasting; Print
- Revenue: ▲CA$24.47 billion (2025)
- Operating income: ▲CA$10.67 billion (2025)
- Net income: ▲CA$6.51 billion (2025)
- Total assets: ▲CA$80.17 billion (2025)
- Total equity: ▲CA$23.31 billion (2025)
- Number of employees: ▼38,683 (2025)
- Subsidiaries: Bell Canada; Bell Media; Bell Technical Solutions; Bell Mobility; Bell Aliant; Virgin Plus; Bell Internet; Bell Satellite TV; Bell Fibe TV; Fibe; Bell MTS; Lucky Mobile; EBOX; The Source (2009–2024) (Converted to Best Buy Express); Glentel Inc. (50%); Northwestel; Ziply Fiber
- Website: bce.ca

BCE Inc., an abbreviation of its former name Bell Canada Enterprises Inc., is a publicly traded Canadian holding company for Bell Canada, which includes telecommunications providers and various mass media assets under its subsidiary Bell Media Inc. Founded through a corporate reorganization in 1983, when Bell Canada, Northern Telecom, and other related companies all became subsidiaries of Bell Canada Enterprises Inc., it is one of Canada's largest corporations. The company is headquartered at 1 Carrefour Alexander-Graham-Bell in the Verdun borough of Montreal, Quebec, Canada.

BCE Inc. is a component of the S&P/TSX 60 and is listed on the Toronto Stock Exchange and the American-based New York Stock Exchange. It was ranked as Canada's 17th biggest corporation by revenue as of June 2014, and as the ninth-largest by capitalization as of June 2015.

== History ==
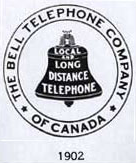
Logo used by the Bell Telephone Company of Canada from 1902 to 1922

The Bell Telephone Company of Canada Ltd. was created by an act of Parliament on April 29, 1880. Later known as Bell Canada, its charter granted it the right to construct telephone lines alongside all public rights-of-way in Canada. Under a licensing agreement with the US-based American Bell Telephone Company, Bell also manufactured telephones and telephone equipment, an activity that would be spun off in a separate company that later became Northern Telecom and then Nortel Networks.

In 1983, all of the Bell Canada group of companies (also known as the "Bell Group") were placed under a new holding company, Bell Canada Enterprises Inc. (BCE). This corporate reorganization resulted in Bell Canada and its subsidiaries, including Northern Telecom (later Nortel Networks) and over 80 others, becoming subsidiaries of the new holding company, BCE. Under the new parent, each company was owned directly by BCE, which had the benefit of freeing the manufacturing company, Nortel, and other holdings from the heavily regulated telephone company, Bell Canada. Under a variety of leaders, BCE has embarked on a series of diversifications, consolidations, and corporate strategies. In 1988, Bell Canada Enterprises was shortened to BCE Inc.

=== Diversification and expansion ===
In 1983, A. Jean de Grandpré, chairman of Bell Canada, was appointed as the first chairman and chief executive officer (CEO) of BCE. The company soon embarked on a major diversification into property development, the energy sector, financial services, and other sectors. Within a few years, it became the first Canadian company to report CA$1 billion in profits.

When Jean Monty assumed the job of CEO in 1998, he pursued a convergence strategy, attempting to combine both content creation and distribution within BCE, and to take greater advantage of the emerging Internet market. BCE's acquisition in 2000 (and subsequent financing) of overseas carrier Teleglobe cost billions of dollars. BCE sold Teleglobe two years later; Jean Monty resigned and was succeeded by Michael Sabia as CEO.

=== Refocus on core business ===
Michael Sabia refocused BCE on its core telecommunications business, prompting BCE to buy back the 20% share in Bell Canada that it had sold in 1999 to Ameritech (later acquired by SBC Corporation). BCE also spun off operating units that it did not consider to be core to its business, including Emergis in 2004, and Bell Globemedia and Telesat Canada in 2006.

On February 1, 2006, stating the need to remain competitive, Bell Canada announced job cuts of 3,000 to 4,000 employees by the end of 2006.

On April 28 that year, BCE announced that CEO Michael Sabia was taking a 455% pay increase; his salary being raised from CA$1.21 million to $6.71 million. The pay included a $1.25 million salary, a $2.2 million bonus that Sabia converted to deferred share units, a long-term incentive payout of $3 million and other compensation, the filing shows. Bell Canada also posted record revenue increases for the previous fiscal year.

Under pressure from investors, on October 11, 2006, BCE announced it would be wound down, with its remaining assets converted to an income trust so its income could be distributed directly to shareholders through dividends, avoiding corporate taxes. The new entity was planned to be named "Bell Canada Income Fund". As part of this restructuring, Bell Aliant offered to take Bell Nordiq private, while remaining separate from the new Bell trust. Due to announced changes in taxation law by the Canadian federal government, on December 12, 2006, BCE announced it would not proceed with its planned conversion to an income trust. It then started planning a restructuring that would have eliminated the BCE holding company, but this was put on hold when the company began attracting takeover bids.

In February 2021, and in line with the growing importance of 5G wireless networks, BCE announced the launch of the largest investment program in its history to double the proportion of Canadians covered.

=== Proposed takeover ===
Due to its stagnant share price, starting in April 2007, BCE was courted for acquisition by pension funds and private equity groups, including a consortium led by the Canada Pension Plan Investment Board (with Kohlberg Kravis Roberts as one of the participants), a consortium led by the Ontario Teachers' Pension Plan (OTPP), and a consortium that included Cerberus Capital Management. On June 30, 2007, BCE accepted a bid of $42.75 per share in cash, for a total valuation of $51.7 billion, from the group led by the OTPP, and including Providence Equity Partners, Madison Dearborn Partners, Merrill Lynch Global Private Equity, and Toronto-Dominion Bank. The proposed deal would have been the largest acquisition in Canadian history and the largest leveraged buyout ever. The deal was approved by BCE shareholders, Quebec Superior Court (whose ruling was overturned by the Quebec Court of Appeal, but was later upheld by the Supreme Court of Canada), and the CRTC, subject to certain conditions for its corporate governance structure to ensure that Bell remained under Canadian control. (See BCE Inc v 1976 Debentureholders for further information).

Due to the tightening of the credit market caused by the subprime mortgage crisis, the investment banks financing the deal – led by Citigroup, Deutsche Bank and the Royal Bank of Scotland – started negotiations on May 16, 2008, to revise the terms of their loans with greater interest rates and greater restrictions to protect themselves. On July 4, 2008, BCE announced that a final agreement had been reached on the terms of the purchase, with all financing in place, and Michael Sabia left BCE, with George Cope assuming the position of CEO on July 11.

On November 26, 2008, BCE announced that KPMG had informed BCE that it would not be able to issue a statement on the solvency of the company after its privatization, one of the required conditions of the buyout. As a result, the purchase was cancelled.

=== Expanding again into mass media ===
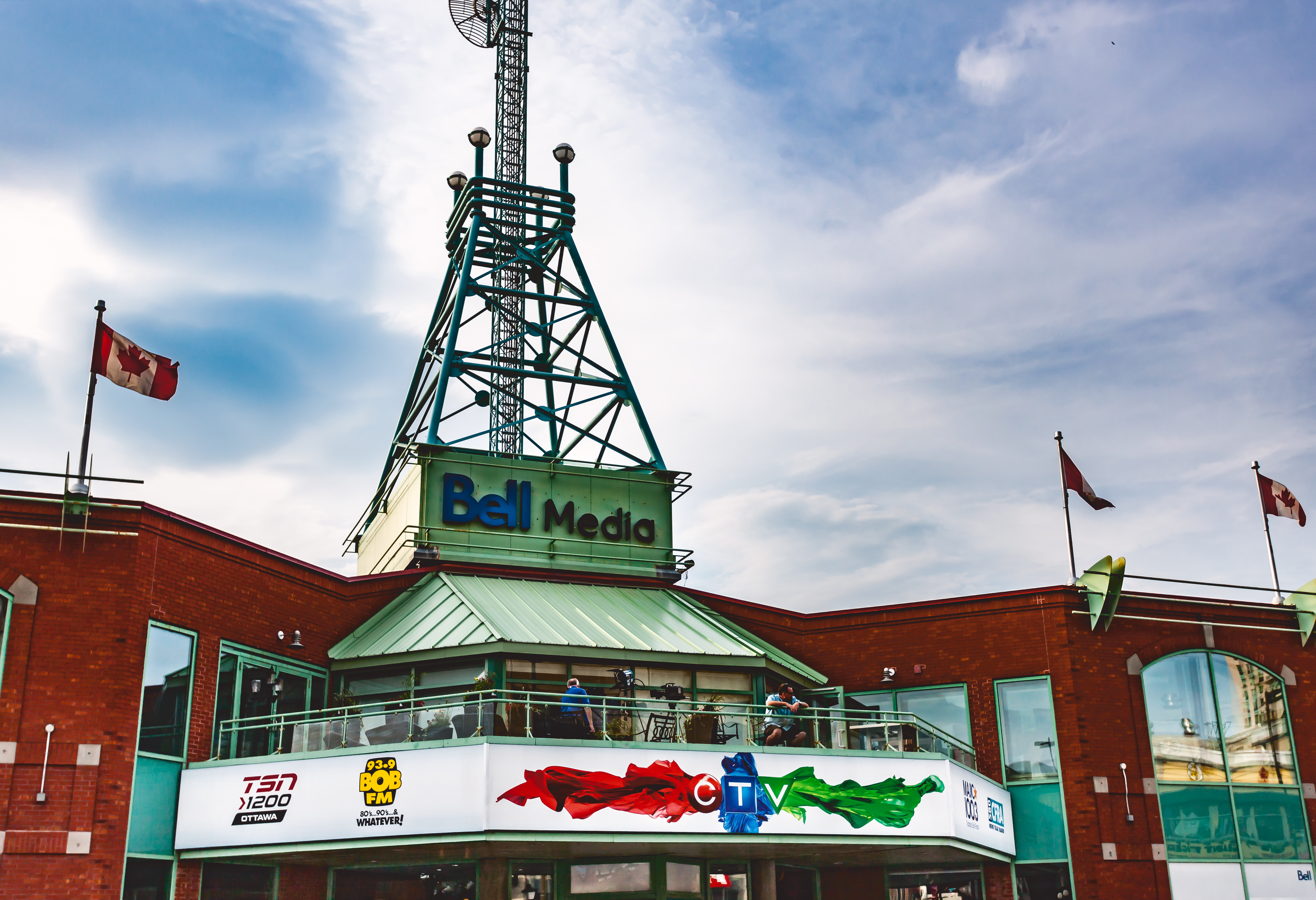
A Bell Media/CTV antenna in Ottawa, 2010. BCE Inc. gained full control of CTVglobemedia in 2010.

With Shaw Communications purchasing the Global Television Network, Vidéotron launching its wireless telephone network with video content as a key selling point, and the enormous popularity of wireless and Internet video and other media streams at the 2010 Vancouver Olympics, Bell once again sought to bring a content provider into its portfolio. In September 2010, Bell announced a deal to reacquire full control of the broadcasting properties owned by CTVglobemedia including the CTV Television Network. Bell also obtained a 15% interest in The Globe and Mail, CTVglobemedia's other major asset, with the remaining 85% owned by the Thomson family. Through this acquisition, Bell responded to an increasing trend away from traditional cable and satellite delivery channels and towards new distribution methods over the Internet and wireless networks. The CRTC approved the transaction in March 2011.

In 2016, BCE announced that it had entered an agreement to acquire Manitoba Telecom Services (MTS) in a transaction worth $3.9 billion. The deal was approved by both companies' shareholders and boards of directors, and closed in March 2017 after the Competition Bureau and other agencies approved of the acquisition.

=== Cuts and changes in business strategies ===
In June 2023, BCE announced that it was cutting 1,300 positions across its telecom and media operations (around three per cent of its workforce, and of which approximately 30% were unfilled vacancies), including six per cent of positions at Bell Media (which had 5,645 employees at the end of 2022). The company also announced it would be closing or selling nine AM radio stations, some of which had changed to automated formats during previous rounds of cuts. Three stations—CKWW, CKOC, and CHAM—were sold to CINA Media Group. BCE blamed a number of industry changes and increasing losses in its news divisions for the cuts, while questioning the regulatory priorities of the federal government and the CRTC; one BCE executive mentioned having waited for reforms on some items for years, while also citing "relentless regulatory intervention" by the CRTC to cut wireless and Internet service pricing. This rationale was questioned by union officials and other experts who felt Bell should have better prepared for industry changes, or could have waited for the full implementation of the Online Streaming Act (Bill C-11) and the Online News Act (Bill C-18).

On February 8, 2024, BCE announced that it would cut 4,800 positions, citing declining revenues, and new CRTC requirements mandating that the company offer wholesale access to its fibreoptic networks to competitors. The cuts resulted in major cuts at Bell Media, including cutbacks at CTV News and the proposed sale of nearly half of its radio stations. In June 2024, BCE announced that it had agreed to sell Northwestel to a consortium of First Nations groups in Northern Canada for around $1 billion.

On November 4, 2024, BCE announced its intent to acquire U.S. telco Ziply Fiber—which operates in the Pacific Northwest—for $5 billion (US$3.6 billion). On August 1, 2025, BCE acquired Ziply Fiber, BCE stated that Ziply will be a wholly owned but separate business unit.

== Major subsidiaries ==
As of 2016, BCE Inc. has three primary divisions: Bell Canada, Bell Mobility, and Bell Media, comprising over 80% of BCE's revenue. Bell Aliant was a subsidiary company formed in 1999 from the merger of the four BCE-controlled telephone companies serving Canada's Atlantic provinces. In 2016, the operations of Bell Aliant were consolidated into those of Bell Canada.

Its Bell MTS Inc. subsidiary, owns 100% of its Bell Canada division which includes Bell Aliant, Bell Mobility, Bell Satellite TV, Bell Media, Bell Fibe TV, Virgin Mobile Canada and Lucky Mobile. Bell's flanker wireless brand, Virgin Mobile was officially rebranded to Virgin Plus on July 19, 2021, to reflect the brand's evolution beyond just wireless offerings which now includes Virgin Plus Internet as well as Virgin Plus TV.

The Bell Media assets include three Canadian conventional television networks, CTV, CTV 2 and Noovo along with dozens of specialty television channels including BNN Bloomberg, CTV Comedy Channel, CTV News Channel, CTV Drama Channel, CTV Sci-Fi Channel, Much, E!, Oxygen, TSN, RDS, USA Network and 109 licensed radio stations in 58 markets across the country. It also operates the premium television service (formerly The Movie Network) and over-the-top streaming service Crave, which most prominently holds rights to HBO, Max, and Starz original series, as well as other feature films and original series.

BCE also owns 18% of the Montreal Canadiens ice hockey club.

=== Bell Canada ===
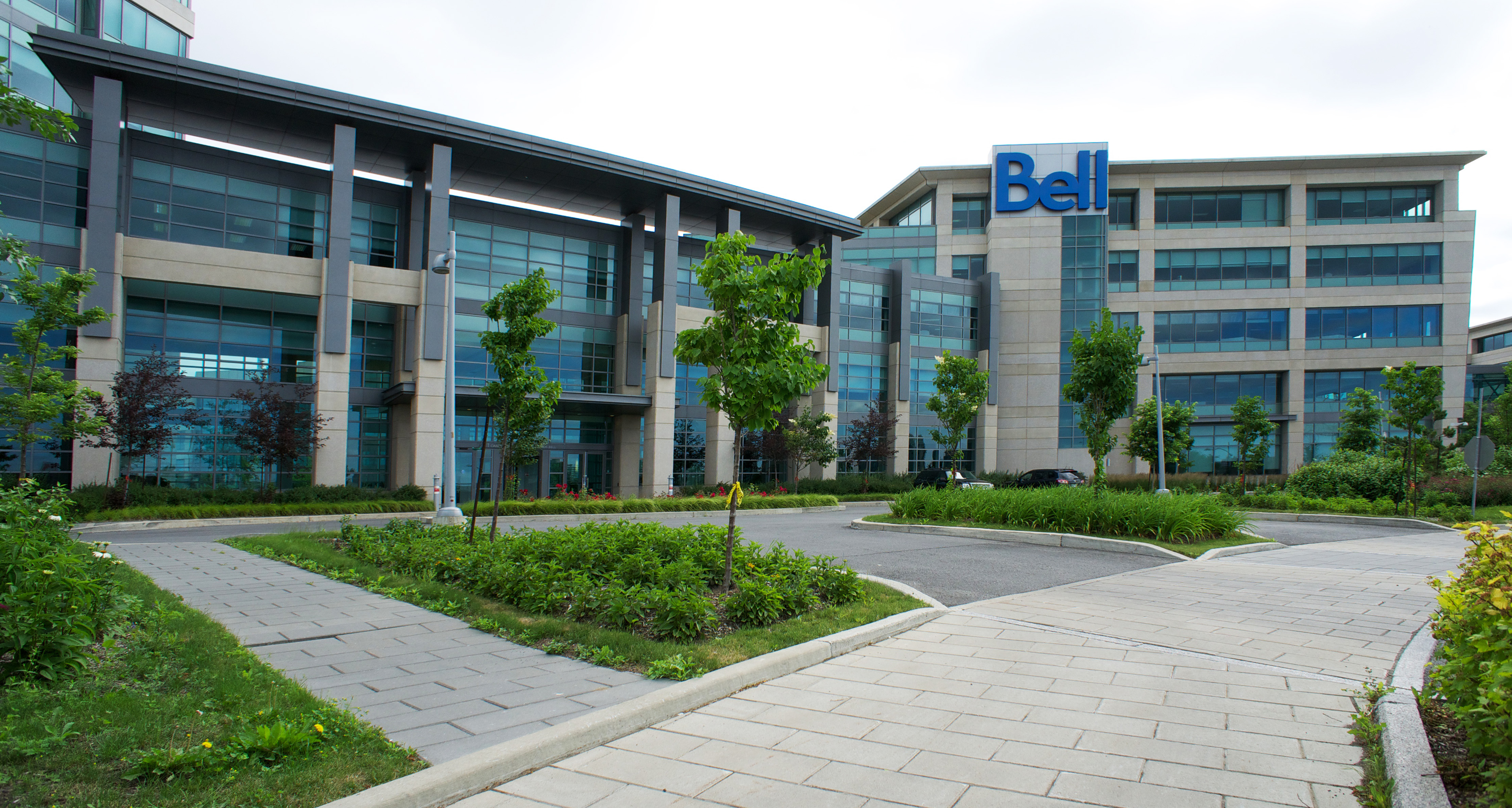
Bell Canada headquarters in Montreal. The telecommunications company is a subsidiary of BCE Inc.

Bell Canada formed the primary historic core of the company in central, Atlantic, and northern Canada.

- Bell Aliant
- Distribution (Ontario, Quebec, Atlantic) – Bell Canada, Cablevision du Nord de Quebec Inc.
- Bell MTS
- Bell Satellite TV – Bell ExpressVu Limited Partnership

=== Bell Media ===
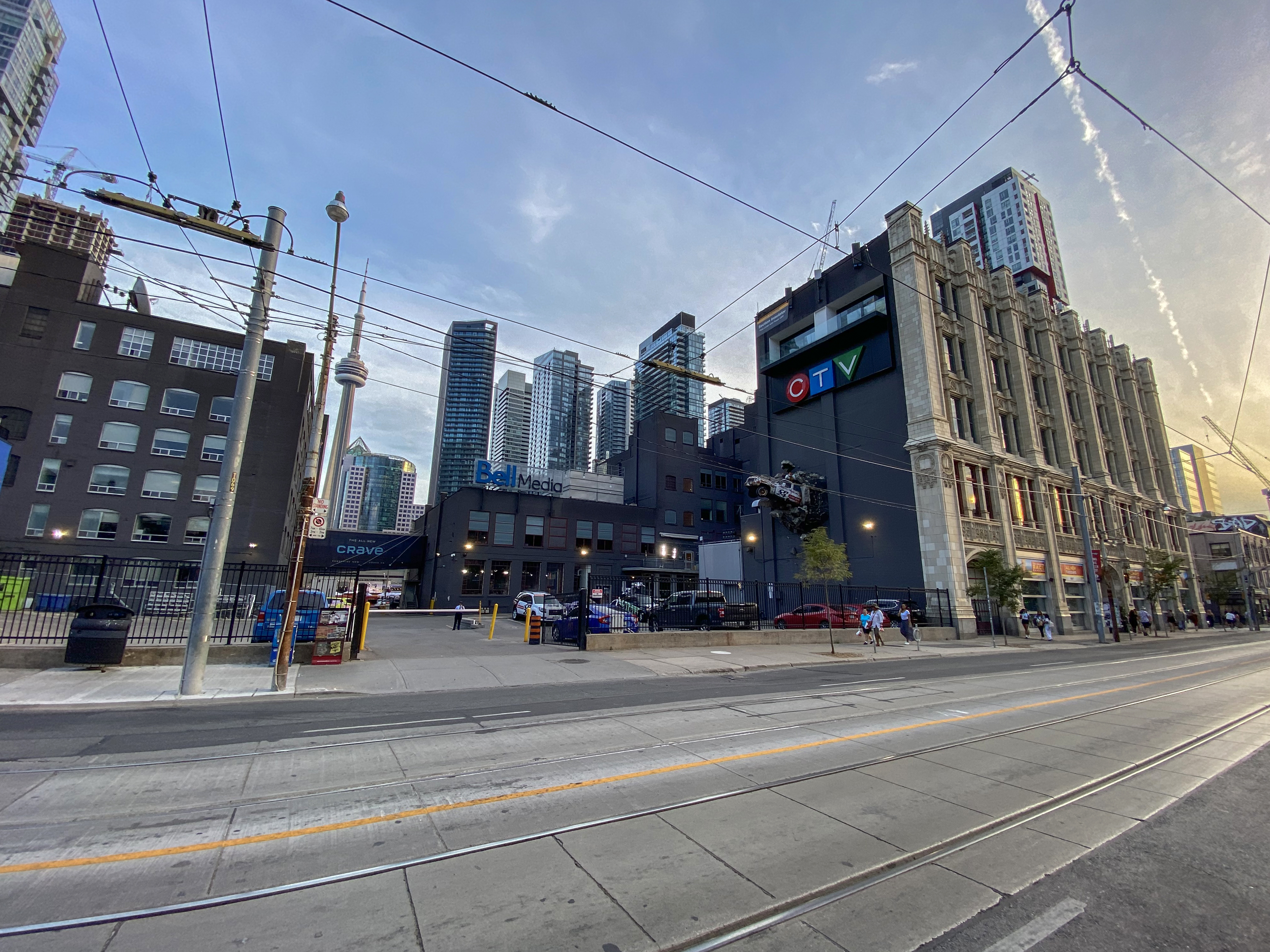
Bell Media headquarters at 299 Queen Street West in Toronto. The company is BCE's mass media subsidiary.

Bell Media is the BCE broadcast and media subsidiary. In 2000, BCE bought the CTV Television Network for $2.3 billion. The company combined CTV with its holdings in The Globe and Mail newspaper to form Bell Globemedia, with BCE owning 70% and Thomson Newspapers and Woodbridge Co. Ltd. the remainder. In 2005, BCE sold its controlling interest in Bell Globemedia for $183 million to Woodbridge, Torstar, and the Ontario Teachers' Pension Plan, with BCE retaining a 20% stake. The company was subsequently renamed CTVglobemedia. In 2007, it acquired most assets of CHUM Limited. In 2010, BCE bought out the other owners, acquiring CTV's specialty television, digital media, conventional TV and radio broadcasting platforms. In August 2015, BCE sold its remaining 15% stake in the Globe and Mail to Woodbridge. Bell Media's subsidiaries:

- Bell Media TV
- Bell Media TV – Sports Specialty Services
- Bell Media TV – Specialty Services (other than Sports)
- Bell Media Radio
- Bell Media Astral – Radio, TV, & Specialty Services

== Other holdings ==
Below is partial list of the holdings of the BCE conglomerate.

=== Montreal Canadiens ===
In 2009, BCE partnered with the Molson family in acquiring the Montreal Canadiens Hockey Club and the Bell Centre. The $575 million purchase was termed "the richest deal in NHL history"; BCE's share was reported to be $40 million.

== Past holdings ==
=== Maple Leaf Sports and Entertainment ===
In 2011, together with Rogers Communications and Kilmer Sports (holding company of Larry Tanenbaum), BCE acquired Maple Leaf Sports & Entertainment, owner of the Toronto Maple Leafs and Toronto Raptors professional sports teams. BCE's interest is held in partnership with Rogers Communications through the holding company 8047286 Canada Inc., 50% owned by Rogers and 50% by BCE holding company 7680147 Canada Inc., which is in turn 74.67% owned by BCE and 25.33% by BCE Master Trust Fund (investment fund of Bell's pension plan).

Kilmer Sports and BCE co-owned the Toronto Argonauts, a team the companies purchased in 2015; BCE and Kilmer owned 50% of the team before selling it to Maple Leaf Sports and Entertainment in 2018 .

On September 18, 2024, it was announced that BCE's 37.5% interest in Maple Leaf Sports & Entertainment (MLSE) would be sold to Rogers Communications for $4.7 billion; BCE stated that the sale would be used to fund foundational changes at the company towards being a "techco" rather than a "telco". As part of the agreement, Bell Media reached long-term deals to maintain its media rights to MLSE-owned teams for 20 years at fair market value.

=== BCE Development ===
BCE Development was founded as Daon Development by Vancouver-based developer Jack Poole in 1964. In the mid-1970s, Daon became known for expanding aggressively in the United States. The company first entered the American market in 1976 and nearly quadrupled its total assets to $1.67 billion in four years. It borrowed heavily to finance deals for premium office space and condominium conversions. By 1981, the company had assets worth more than $2 billion. When interest rates soared, however, Daon was caught overextended, could not meet its debt payments, and was forced into a major restructuring with its bankers. In 1985, BCE acquired 68% of Daon from its creditors and changed its name to BCE Development Corporation in February 1986. In March 1986, it agreed to acquire US$1 billion of commercial real estate from the American subsidiary of the Oxford Development Group Ltd., more than doubling BCED's portfolio. BCE stated its goal was to convert from a land developer to a developer of prime commercial properties.

In July 1990, BCE Inc. sold 50% ownership in BCE Development to Carena Developments Ltd. (controlled by the Toronto branch of the Bronfman family). BCED was renamed Brookfield Development Inc. (now Brookfield Asset Management) followed in 1994 by the remaining 50%.

=== Montreal Trust ===
In March 1989, BCE bought a 64% stake in Montreal Trust from Power Financial for $547 million. The diversification was considered a "natural evolution" due to BCE's long-standing interest in financial services, its familiarity with selling services to the public, and its in-house money management operations. In 1993, BCE sold Montreal Trust to Scotiabank for about $290 million, taking a substantial loss.

=== Nortel Networks ===
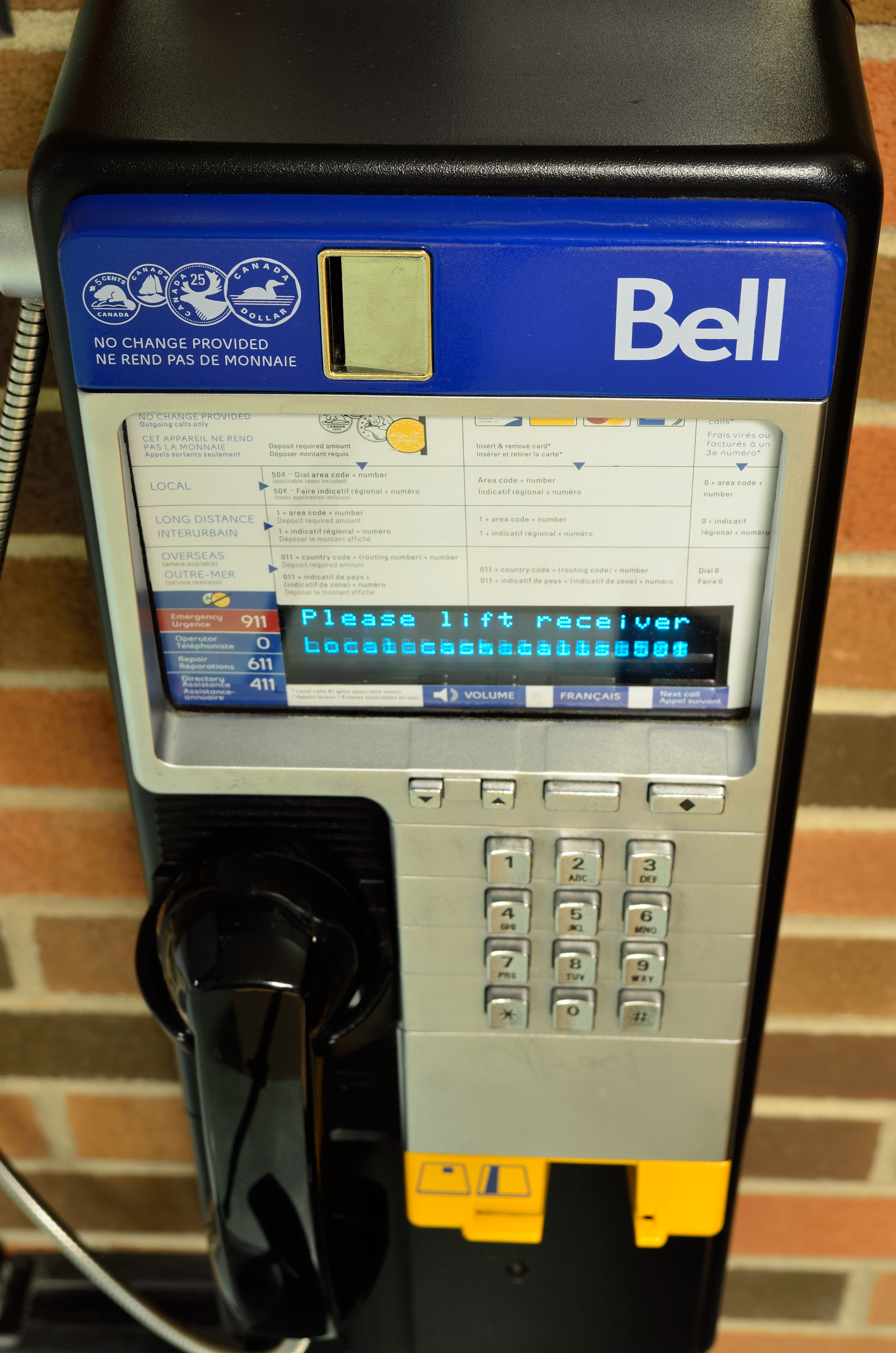
A Bell Nortel Millennium payphone, introduced in the 1990s. Nortel was a BCE subsidiary from 1983 to 2000.

When BCE was created in 1983, Northern Telecom was transferred from a subsidiary of CRTC-regulated Bell Canada to a non-regulated subsidiary of BCE. In 1998, with Nortel's acquisition of Bay Networks, the company's name was changed to Nortel Networks. As a consequence of the stock transaction used to purchase Bay Networks, BCE's holding was diluted to a minority stake. In 2000, BCE spun out Nortel, distributing its stock in Nortel to its shareholders. Nortel's share price collapsed with the dot-com crash of 2000 and combined with a mishandling of a subsequent accounting investigation, the company never fully recovered. It was liquidated in 2009.

=== Teleglobe Inc. ===
In 1987, BCE purchased a 30% stake in Memotec Data Corporation for $196 million. When Memotec purchased international telecommunications carrier Teleglobe Canada from the Canadian government in 1987, the company was renamed Teleglobe Inc. In March 2000, BCE announced the purchase of the Teleglobe shares it did not own for $9.65 billion. In April 2002, BCE announced it was cutting off long-term funding of Teleglobe, would give up on the company, and take a charge of up to $8.5 billion. In 2005, Teleglobe was sold to the Tata Group and is now known as VSNL International Canada. In September 2002, it sold its voice and data business for $197 million.

=== Telesat Canada ===
In 1970, Bell Canada acquired a minority interest in satellite telecommunications carrier Telesat Canada. In 1998, BCE raised its stake to 100% at a cost of $158 million for the 42% of shares it did not already own. In December 2006, BCE announced the sale of Telesat to Loral Space & Communications and the Public Sector Pension Investment Board for CAD$3.28 billion.

=== TransCanada Pipelines ===
In 1983, BCE acquired a controlling 42% stake in TransCanada PipeLines Limited (TCPL). In 1990, it announced its departure from the energy sector and sold its stake in TCPL for $1.1 billion.

== Corporate governance ==
=== Board of directors ===
As of March 2020, the current board of directors are: Barry K. Allen, Mirko Bibic, Sophie Brochu, Robert E. Brown, David F. Denison, Robert P. Dexter, Ian Greenberg, Katherine Lee, Monique F. Leroux, Calin Rovinescu, Karen Sheriff, Robert C. Simmonds, and Paul R. Weiss.

Since inception, BCE has had five CEOs:

- A. Jean de Grandpré: 1983–1988
- Raymond Cyr: 1988–1992
- Lynton Wilson: 1992–1998
- Jean Monty: 1998–2002
- Michael Sabia: 2002–2008
- George A. Cope: 2008–2020
- Mirko Bibic: 2020-present

== See also ==
- Communications in Canada
- Tier 1 network
- List of mobile network operators
- List of telephone operating companies
- Triple play (telecommunications)
