= Hazen Sise =

Canadian architect (1906–1974)

- Born: 22 October 1906
- Died: 15 February 1974 (aged 67)
- Education: Massachusetts Institute of Technology (1929)
- Spouse: Nancy Elizabeth Borden (m. 1942)

Hazen Edward Sise (22 October 1906 – 15 February 1974) was a Canadian architect, educator, and humanitarian.

== Early life and education ==
Sise was born in 1906 in Montreal, Quebec. His father, Paul Fleetford Sise, was president of the Northern Electric Company, and his uncle president of the Bell Telephone Company of Canada. He attended Selwyn House School in Montreal and Bishop's College School in Lennoxville, Quebec. He studied at the Royal Military College of Canada in Kingston, Ontario but left after his second year because he decided to become an architect. He was greatly influenced to study architecture by discovering wonderful folios of the works of Christopher Wren in the Royal Military College of Canada library. He was able to transfer from second-year at Royal Military College into second-year at the School of Architecture at McGill University. After two years of study at McGill (1925–27), he transferred to the Massachusetts Institute of Technology in Cambridge where he graduated in 1929. After graduation, he went to London, England, to do post-graduate studies in architecture and town planning.

== Career ==
He was employed at Le Corbusier’s architectural office in Paris, France, and the Howe and Lescaze firm in New York City. Upon his return to Montreal in 1931, he participated in the establishment of the Atelier school, which held art classes, lectures and exhibitions. The Atelier School's aim was to bring together artists interested in modern painting, while stressing the importance of classical principles in art, and the art of the European moderns. He wrote, 'The essential qualities of a work of art lie in the relationships of form to form, and of colour to colour. From these the eye, and especially the trained eye derives its pleasure and all artistic emotion must find its expression through these means.' He was involved in the arts and theatre communities in Montreal. He regularly attended the gatherings held at painter John Lyman’s home, developing friendships with artists such as André Biéler, Jean Palardy, and Jori Smith. He participated in the Fourth International Congress of Modern Architecture in Athens. He was interested in creating a link between the artist and the public, for example through the promotion of mural painting.

He was interested in the international situation during the thirties. When the Spanish Civil War broke out, he joined the Canadian Blood Transfusion Unit, which was run by Communist Party activist Dr Norman Bethune in the Loyalist (Republican Government) zone, based in Madrid. He often drove a Red Cross Ambulance (1936-9). He later became the chief fundraiser for the Committee to Aid Spanish Democracy and on at least one occasion acted as an interlocuter for agents of the Soviet Union active among pro-Republican forces.

Returning to Canada just before the beginning of World War II, he joined the Staff of the National Film Board of Canada serving first in Ottawa, Ontario and later in Washington, D.C. After the war, he was invited to give lectures in architectural history at McGill University School of Architecture. Since he was engaged in the practice of the profession of architecture, his practical experience complemented theoretical studies. In Montreal, he was an active member of the city's Parks and Playgrounds Association, contributing to the restoration and preservation of urban open spaces. He cofounded the architectural co-operative known as Arcop, the successor firm to Affleck, Desbarats, Dimakopoulos, Lebensold, Sise in 1955. He was an outspoken advocate of social justice and a faithful follower of the modern movement. He was concerned with the furtherance of modern art and architecture, not only in Montreal but across Canada. In 1968, he retired from the architectural co-operative.

== Later life ==
From 1970–74, he consulted with the National Capital Commission on saving of traditional architecture. He died in 1974.

== Project list ==
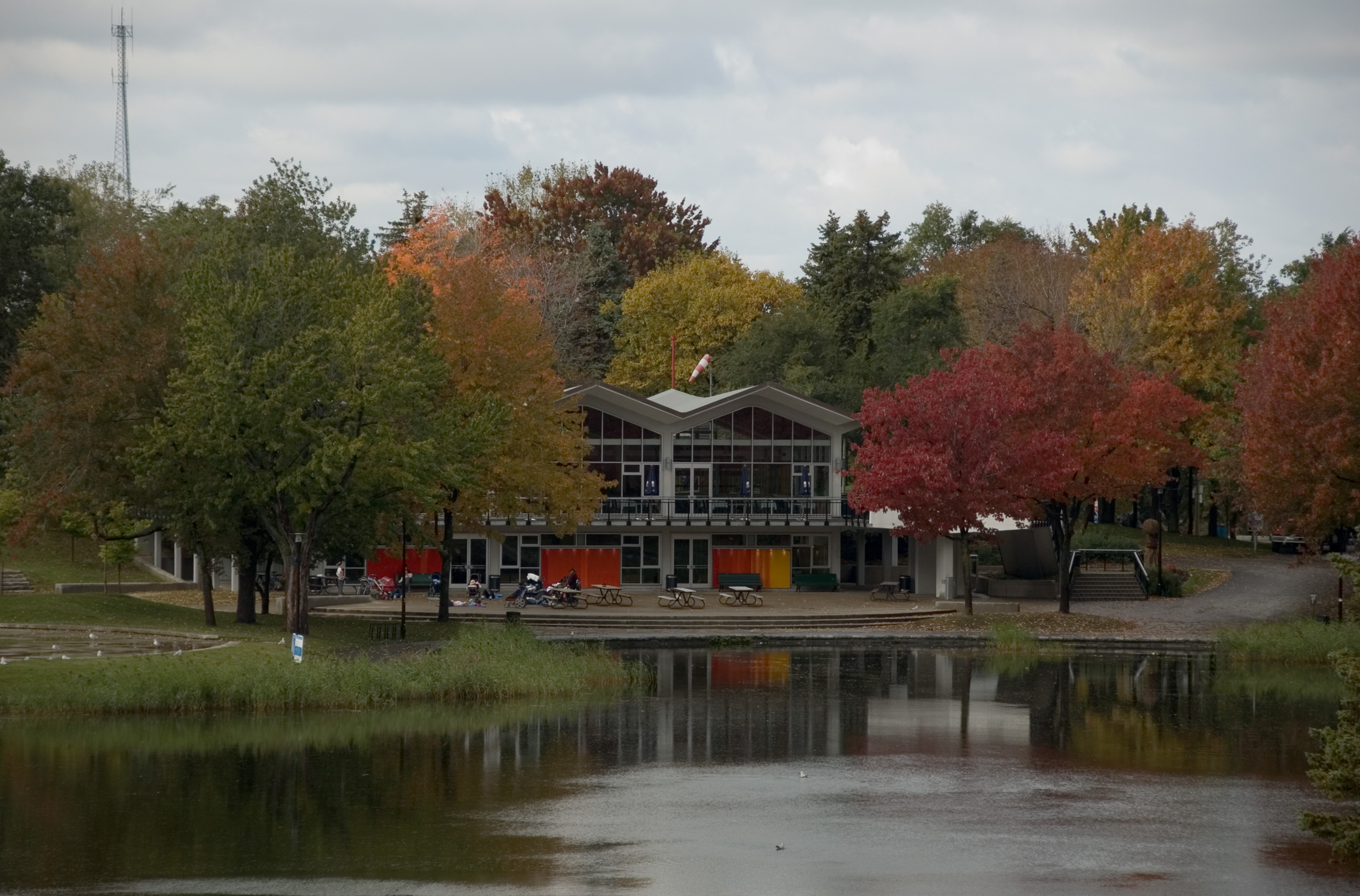
Beaver Lake Pavilion (Lac aux castors), Mount Royal Park, Montreal, Quebec from 1955–1958.

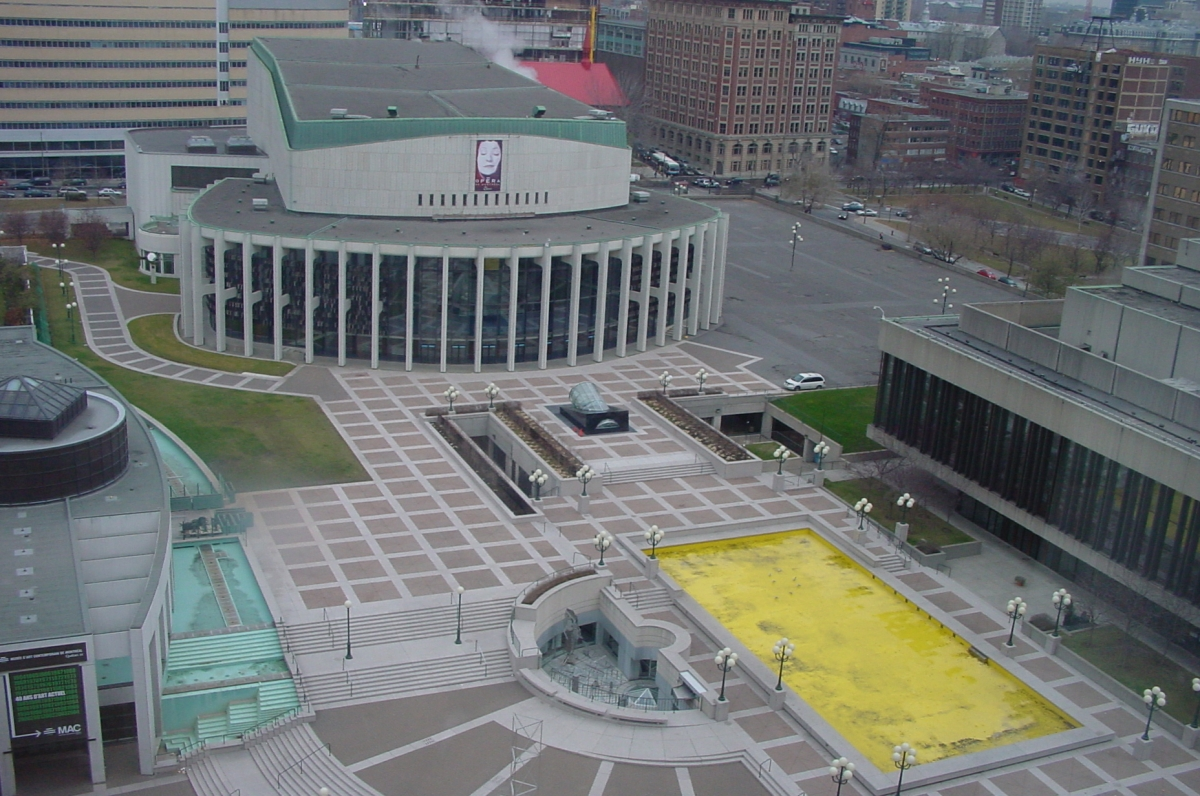
Grande Salle (now Salle Wilfrid-Pelletier) Place des Arts, Montreal, Quebec(1958–63)

National Arts Centre, Ottawa, Ontario (completed 1969).

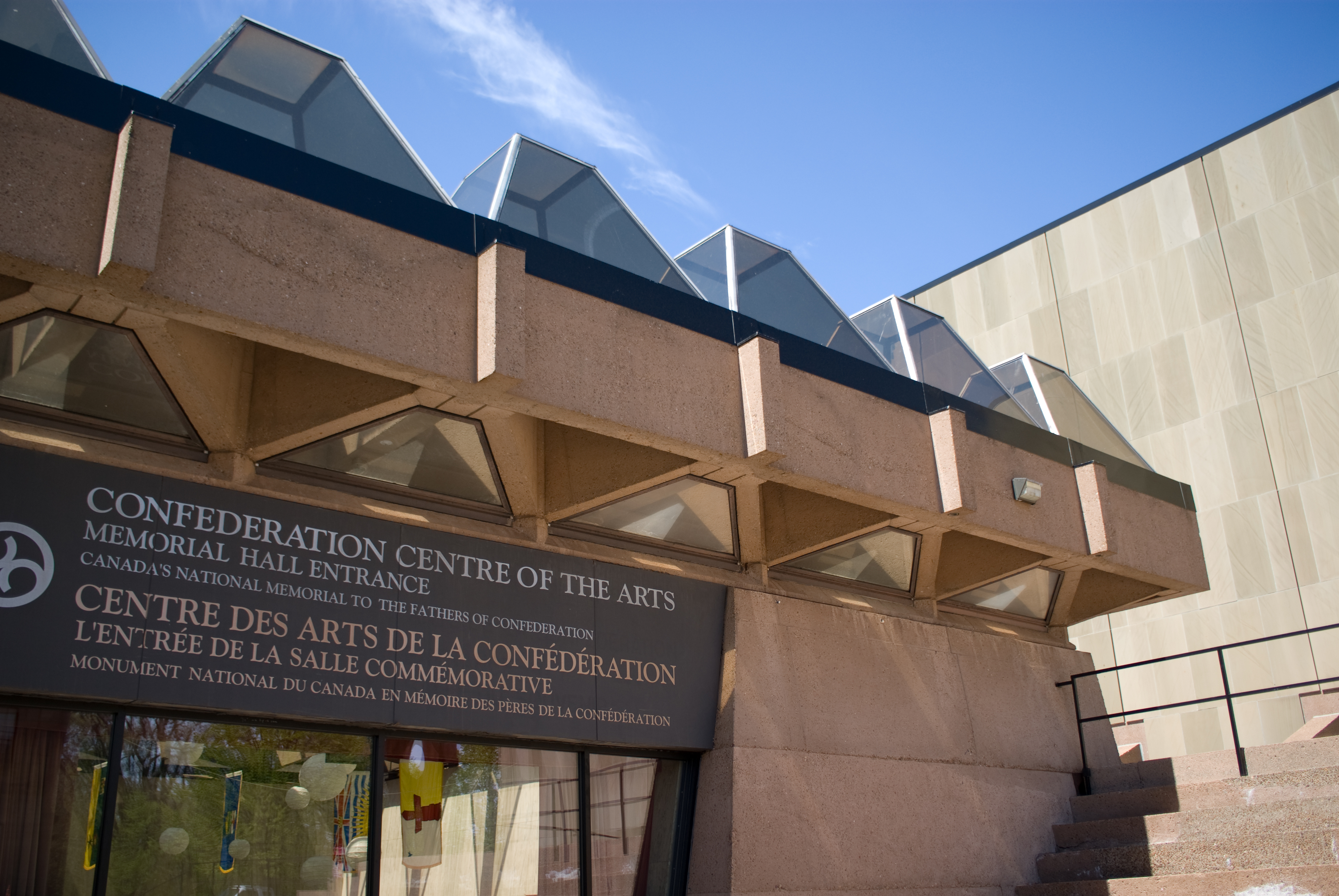
Confederation Centre of the Arts, Charlottetown, Prince Edward Island (completed 1964)
- He co-designed the Beaver Lake Pavilion, built in Mount Royal Park, Montreal, Quebec from 1955–1958. A preliminary sketch of the Beaver Lake Pavilion was featured in the first issue of The Canadian Architect in December 1955, and the completed building was covered in 1958.
- He co-designed the Post Office building in the Town of Mount Royal, Quebec for which he received the Massey Medal.

The ARCOP, of which he was a founding member, contributed to several projects:

- Man the Producer and Man the Explorer theme buildings at Expo 67, Montreal, Quebec (1967);

== See also ==
- List of Bishop's College School alumni
