= Gordon Nixon =

Canadian businessman

Gordon Nixon CM, O.Ont
- Born: 25 January 1957 (age 69); Montreal, Quebec
- Education: Queen's University (BCom 1979)
- Known for: president, CEO and director of Royal Bank of Canada
- Board member of: BlackRock
- Spouse: Janet Raymond

Gordon Melbourne Nixon CM OOnt (born 25 January 1957) is a Canadian businessman and was the president, CEO and director of Royal Bank of Canada, from 2001 to 2014. He is Chairman of Fiserv, past chairman of Bell Canada Enterprises, lead director of George Weston Limited, director and chairman of the Nominating, Governance & Sustainability Committee of BlackRock Inc. and is on the advisory committee of KingSett Capital.

== Early life ==
Born in Montreal, Quebec, he was educated at Lower Canada College. Nixon received an honours Bachelor of Commerce degree from Queen's University in 1979, and holds honorary Doctor of Laws from both Queen's University and Dalhousie University.

== Career ==
Nixon began his career in 1979 at Dominion Securities in Toronto and worked in global markets, investment banking and in 1986 transferred to Tokyo to assume responsibility for the firm's operations in Japan. Dominion Securities was acquired by Royal Bank of Canada in 1987 and Nixon returned to Toronto in 1989 as a managing director of the Investment Banking Division and in 1995 was appointed head of Global Investment Banking. In 1999, Nixon became chief executive officer of RBC Capital Markets and a member of Royal Bank's executive committee.

Nixon was appointed president of Royal Bank of Canada on April 1, 2001, and chief executive officer on August 1, 2001, succeeding John Cleghorn in both capacities. At the age of 44 when he was appointed chief executive, Nixon became the youngest person to ever head a major Canadian bank. In September 2004, Nixon initiated a major restructuring of RBC.

Nixon relinquished his title of president at the Annual Meeting on February 26, 2014, and after 13 years as chief executive officer he retired on August 1, 2014, being succeeded in both roles by David McKay who was previously Group Head of Personal & Commercial Banking.

== Other ==
Nixon was chairman of BCE Inc. He is currently chairman of Fiserv, lead director of George Weston Limited, director and chairman of the Nominating, Governance & Sustainability Committee of BlackRock Inc., and he is also on the advisory board of KingSett Capital.

Nixon is past chairman of MaRS, a not-for-profit organization that connects science, business and capital, he is a director of the Art Gallery of Ontario. He is past chairman of the Canadian Council of chief executives, the premier's Jobs and Prosperity Council and has served as a director of a number of organizations in the arts, health care and education.

Nixon has been awarded the Order of Canada and the Order of Ontario and is an inductee into the Canadian Business Hall of Fame and the Investment Industry Hall of Fame. He is a recipient of Canada's Outstanding CEO of the Year Award, the Canadian Business Leader Award, and has been included on both Barron's list of the World's Best CEO's and Bloomberg's list of the World's Most Influential People. Nixon is an Honouree of the Public Policy Forum and is a recipient of the CIJA/UJA Words and Deeds Leadership Award, the Rotary Foundation's Paul Harris Fellowship, the Queen's Golden Jubilee and Diamond Jubilee Medals, a Learning Partnership Champion of Public Education Tribute and an American Banker Innovator of the Year Award. Nixon is a recipient of Golf Canada's 2019 Legacy Award and was inducted into the Queen's University Rugby Hall of Fame.

== Personal life ==
He is married to Janet Nixon and has three children.

Business positions
Preceded by John Cleghorn	CEO of Royal Bank of Canada; 2001- 2014	Succeeded by David McKay
