= Edward Fleetford Sise =

Canadian businessman (1877–1943)

- Born: 26 January 1877; Boston, Massachusetts
- Died: 3 July 1943 (aged 66); Montreal, Quebec
- Spouse: Anna March Shackford (m. 1911)

Edward Fleetford Sise (26 January 1877 – 3 July 1943) was a Canadian businessman, who was the first President of Northern Electric Company from 1914 to 1919.

== See also ==
- Charles Fleetford Sise Sr.
- Charles Fleetford Sise Jr.
- Paul Fleetford Sise

Business positions
Preceded by None	President of the Northern Electric Company; 1914–1919	Succeeded by Paul Fleetford Sise
