= Thomas Wardrope Eadie =

Canadian businessman (1898–1986)

- Born: 26 July 1898; Ottawa, Ontario
- Died: 6 September 1986 (aged 88); Montreal, Quebec
- Education: McGill University (BSc 1923)
- Spouse: Gladys Dorothy Macfarlane (m. 1927)

Thomas Wardrope Eadie (26 July 1898 – 6 September 1986) the son of Robert and Flora (Stewart). He served as president of Bell Canada from July 1, 1953, to July 31, 1963. Eadie graduated from McGill University (Engineering) in 1923 and immediately signed on with Bell Canada and over the next 30 years he occupied a succession of engineering and administrative positions before his appointment as president of Bell Canada. In the 1950s, Eadie presided over the company's role in building the Trans Canada Microwave System, now recognized as one of the major engineering feats of the last century.

== See also ==
- Thomas W. Eadie Medal
- Marcel Vincent
- Charles Fleetford Sise
- CBLT

Business positions
Preceded by Frederick Johnson	President of the Bell Telephone Company of Canada; 1953-1963	Succeeded by Marcel Vincent
