= Charles Fleetford Sise =

American-born Canadian businessman

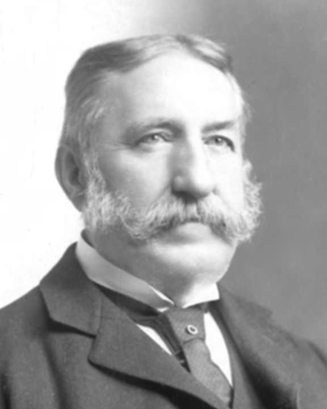
- Born: 27 September 1834; Portsmouth, New Hampshire, U.S.
- Died: 9 April 1918 (aged 83); Montreal, Quebec, Canada
- Children: Charles Fleetford Sise Jr. Edward Fleetford Sise; Paul Fleetford Sise

Charles Fleetford Sise Sr. (27 September 1834 – 9 April 1918) was an American-born Canadian businessman and one of the first presidents of Bell Canada. He was also part of its first board of directors, and that of the Northern Electric and Manufacturing Company (later known as Nortel), the telephone company's equipment manufacturer, from 1895 to 1918.

He had formerly been a "hard nosed" sea captain before being commissioned as an agent by the newly formed National Bell Telephone Company of Boston, Massachusetts, to help lead its incipient Canadian division.

From 1880, when he was hired as an agent of Bell Canada, until his death in 1918, he played a major role in the company's development. During this period he oversaw Bell's divestiture of operations in the Maritime Provinces between 1887 and 1889 and later in the Prairie Provinces between 1908 and 1909. His leadership helped shape the company's management and organization, and several of his associates remained in senior positions until the 1940s.

== Biography ==
Sise was born on 27 September 1834 in Portsmouth, New Hampshire as the sixth son of Edward Fleetford Sise and Ann Mary Simes. His father owned shares in ships and was also a merchant. Sise had two wives, first marrying Clara Bunker in Mobile Alabama on 20 February 1860, with whom he had four daughters, and then marrying Caroline Johnson Pettingell in Newburyport, Massachusetts on 4 June 1873, with whom he had three sons.

He received his education only to age 16 at which time he was hired on to one of the ships owned by his family. He subsequently received his commission as a ship's captain, again on a family owned merchant ship, the Annie Sise, six years later. He commanded ships across the Atlantic and Pacific oceans for several years until his first marriage in 1860, when he entered into the ship-brokering business in New Orleans.

Born and raised as a 'northerner', Sise was closer to the sympathies of the Southern Confederacy during the American Civil War, and reportedly helped their efforts, likely due to his friendship with the Confederacy's president, Jefferson Davis. Sise served as a blockade runner and intelligence agent for the Confederated States, and was also Davis' personal secretary, leading to a several years long estrangement with his family in Portsmouth .

After starting his own shipping and merchandizing business in Liverpool, England in 1864 which he maintained for several years, he returned to his family's shipping business to skipper their Annie Sise on a commercial voyage to Australia in 1867. After his return to the United States he left the maritime shipping business and started off anew in the insurance industry as the U.S. representative for the Royal Canadian Insurance Company of Montreal, where he was to meet the future president of the Bell Telephone Company of Canada.

In March 1880 he was engaged as a corporate agent by William H. Forbes, president of the National Bell Telephone of Boston, and sent to Montreal to lead Bell's consolidation of the telephone industry in Canada, a task he vigorously pursued over the remainder of his life. That included the company's fight against Western Union and the acquisition of several telephone and telegraph companies operating in Canada, acquiring over 3,000 existing telephones in the process.

Sise spent the remainder of this life battling for the Canadian telephone company he helped create. Biographer Robert E. Babe wrote of his character:

"An integrated, albeit incomplete and possibly lonely personality, Sise was an energetic, meticulous, and autocratic business leader who, standing aloof from employees, generally commanded their utmost loyalty and respect. Toward competitors he was cold, calculating, and often ruthless. Toward governments he could be abrasive and, on occasion, disingenuous. A member of the St James and Mount Royal clubs of Montreal, this austere and quiet man none the less found his primary source of relaxation and rest in his home. Some 40 to 45 years older than the sons of his second marriage, Sise invoked in his domicile an aura of order and discipline rather than of intimacy with his progeny. He pursued no hobbies apart from extensive reading, so absorbed was he in the defense and advancement of the company he had formed."

In 1880 Sise had been hired by Forbes as a special agent for Bell Canada and its associated Canadian Telephone Company (its holding company). He then served as its vice-president and managing director from 1880 to 1890, and then as its president and general director from 1890 until 1915. In 1915 he was promoted to chairman of the board, a position he held until his death in 1918. During his years he was the company's single greatest advocate and leader, also overseeing its necessary divestiture of territories in the Maritime Provinces in 1887–89 and from the Prairie Provinces during 1908–09. His influence and direction during those many years was extensive, pivotal and decisive, and also included the installation of key associates (including his sons) to senior positions within Bell and its allied Northern Electric, his influence ultimately enduring until the last of them retired in 1944.

Sise died on 9 April 1918 in Montreal. The Charles Fleetford Sise Chapter of the Telephone Pioneers of America was subsequently named after him.

== Family involvement in telecommunications ==
His sons were also involved in Bell Canada and its equipment manufacturing division, Northern Electric (later to be renamed Nortel):

- Charles Fleetford Sise Jr. headed Bell Canada from 1925 to 1944.
- Edward Fleetford Sise President of Northern Electric 1914–1919
- Paul Fleetford Sise President of Northern Electric 1919–1948

== See also ==
- Thomas Wardrope Eadie

Business positions
Preceded by Andrew Robertson	President of the Bell Telephone Company of Canada; 1890-1915	Succeeded by Lewis Brown McFarlane
