= Paul Fleetford Sise =

Canadian businessman

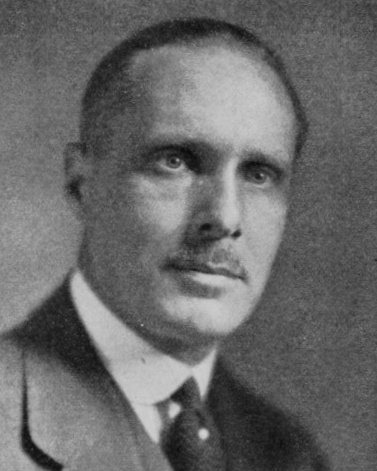
- Born: 10 November 1879; Boston, Massachusetts
- Died: 1 August 1951 (aged 71)
- Education: McGill University (BSc 1901)
- Spouse: Phyllis Emily Augusta Porteous (m. 1905)

Paul Fleetford Sise (November 10, 1879 – August 1, 1951) was a Canadian businessman, President of Northern Electric (Nortel 1919 - 1948), graduated from McGill University in 1901 and was an adjutant to the 148th Battalion, CEF, from Montreal. Major Sise also served in the 259th Battalion, Canadian Rifles, CEF (Siberia) as part of the Canadian Siberian Expeditionary Force, where he was one of the three panel members for the court martial of nine soldiers charged with mutiny (despite the fact he had no legal training.)

Paul's son, Hazen Edward Sise, became a prominent architect.

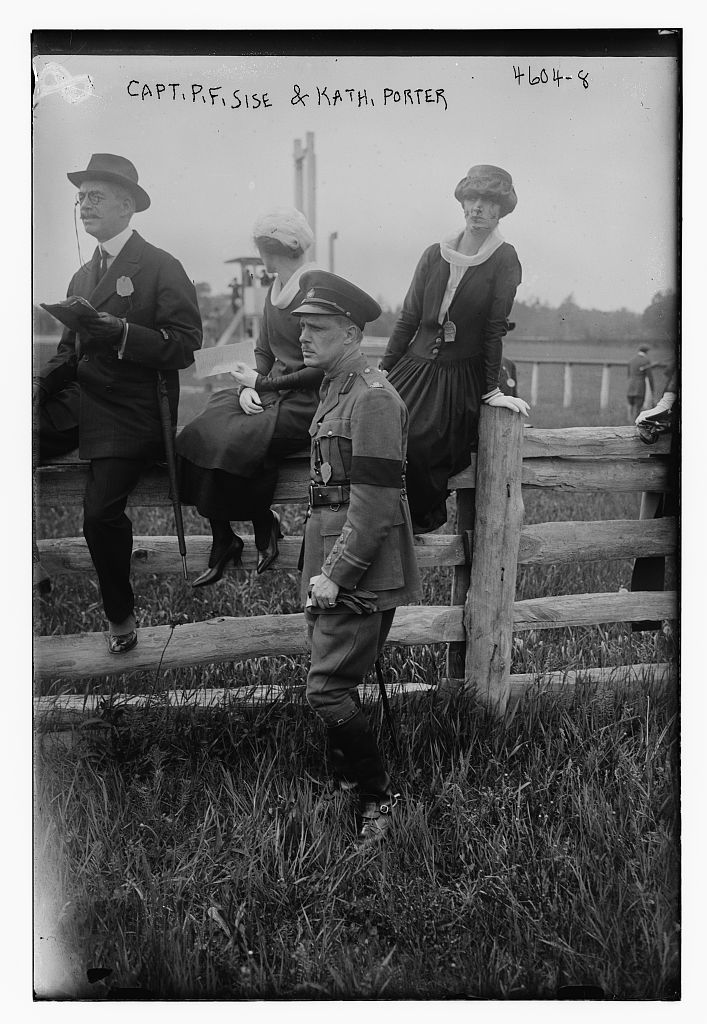
Sise c1918-1920

== See also ==
- Charles Fleetford Sise Sr.
- Charles Fleetford Sise Jr. (brother)
- Edward Fleetford Sise (brother)

Business positions
Preceded by Edward Fleetford Sise	President of the Northern Electric Company; 1919–1948	Succeeded by Ralph Holley Keefler
