= Sisse =

Sisse is a Danish female given name. Notable people with this name include:

- Sisse Brimberg (born 1948), Danish photographer
- Sisse Egeborg (born 1984), Danish Paralympic swimmer
- Sisse Fisker (born 1976), Danish television presenter
- Sisse Graum Jørgensen (born 1972), Danish film producer
- Sisse Marie (born 1985), Danish singer, model, TV hostess and songwriter
- Sisse Reingaard (1946–2024), Danish film actress
