= George A. Cope =

Canadian businessman

- Born: 28 July 1961 (age 65); Scarborough, Ontario
- Education: University of Western Ontario (BBA, 1984)

George Alexander Cope CM (born 28 July 1961) is a Canadian businessman, and the former CEO of Bell Canada.

== Early life and education ==
Cope was born in Scarborough, Ontario and grew up in Port Perry. Cope's father played for a short time for the Toronto Argonauts, after which he ran gas stations and rustproofing shops. Cope's mother ran a store that sold fabrics. Cope attended Port Perry High School and played on the high school's basketball team and was also student council president. He earned a Bachelor of Business Administration degree with honours in 1984 from the Ivey Business School at Western University.

== Career ==
Cope was named CEO of Bell at the age of 53 as part of a proposed thirty five billion dollar leveraged buyout led by Providence Equity and the Ontario Teachers' Pension Fund in 2008. Due to the credit crunch and the 2008 financial crisis, the buyout was cancelled. He led a competitor, Telus Mobility, before becoming President at Bell in 2005. He previously ran Clearnet, a wireless company that was bought by Telus in 2000.

In 2010, Cope led the launch of the Bell Let's Talk Initiative, a major corporate campaign to improve mental health in Canada, for which he received The Queen's Diamond Jubilee Medal.

In June 2019, BCE announced Cope will retire in January 2020, at which point COO Mirko Bibic will become CEO. Over the past 10 years, under Cope's leadership, company profits tripled to $3.05 billion.

== Community involvement ==
Cope sits on the board of Maple Leaf Sports & Entertainment (MLSE) and was instrumental in the firing of Toronto Maple Leafs general manager Brian Burke after BCE acquired MLSE. As of 2015, Cope is also a member of the Richard Ivey School of Business Advisory Board at Western University and a member of the Business Council of Canada.

== Recognition ==
In 2014, George Cope was appointed a Member of the Order of Canada for his leadership in corporate social responsibility, particularly in the area of mental health, and for his contributions to the telecommunications industry. He was named Canada’s Outstanding CEO of the Year in 2015 and was inducted into the Canadian Business Hall of Fame in 2018. He received the Queen’s Diamond Jubilee Medal in 2012.
