= Timeline of Nortel =

Timeline of major events for Nortel.

== Bell Telephone Company of Canada ==
- 1882: A mechanical department is created within Bell Telephone Company of Canada to manufacture telephone equipment for Canada,
- 1886: The mechanical department starts manufacturing its first switchboard, a 50 line Standard Magneto Switchboard.
- 1888: The mechanical department has 50 employees.
- 1890: The mechanical department has 200 employees and a new factory is under construction.
- 1895: Northern Electric and Manufacturing Company Limited is spun off from Bell Canada

== Northern Electric and Manufacturing Company ==
- 7 December 1895: Northern Electric and Manufacturing Company Limited is incorporated with initial stock capital of $50,000 at $100 per share, with 93 percent held by Bell Canada
- March 24, 1896: The first general stockholders meeting
- December 1899: Bell Telephone Company of Canada buys a cabling company for $500,000 later named The Wire and Cable Company.
- 1900 Northern Electric and Manufacturing manufactures the first Canadian wind-up gramophones .
- 1911: The Wire and Cable company changes its name to the Imperial Wire and Cable Company.

== Northern Electric Company ==
- 1913: The construction of a new manufacturing plant started at Shearer Street in Montreal, Quebec, Canada, as preparations began for the two manufacturing companies' integration.
- January 1914: the Northern Electric and Manufacturing Company and the Imperial Wire and Cable Company merge into the Northern Electric Company,
- 1915: the new company opens the doors on a new manufacturing plant in January. This facility at Shearer Street was the primary manufacturing center until the mid-1950s. Edward Fleetford Sise was the president and his brother Paul Fleetford Sise was the vice-president and general manager.
- During the First World War Northern Electric manufactured the Portable Commutator, a one-wire telegraphic switchboard for military operations in the field.
- 1922: Northern starts to produce, for $5, the "Peanut" vacuum tube, which required only a single dry-cell battery. The use of alternating current was still under development during this time. The "Northern Electric Peanut tube was the smallest tube made, and drew only one-tenth of an ampere and was the most remarkable radio frequency amplifier ever made."
- During the 1920s: Northern Electric made kettles, toasters, cigar lighters, electric stoves, and washing machines.
- January 1923: Northern Electric starts operating an AM radio station with call letters CHYC, in the Shearer Street plant, and much of the programming was religious services for the Northern Electric employees and families in the community.
- July 1923: CHYC-AM was the first radio station to provide entertainment to the riders of the transcontinental train, in a parlor car fitted with a radio set to receive the broadcast as it left Montreal and traveled west.
- Later1920s: Northern creates the first talking movie sound system in the British Empire for a theater in Montreal.
- 1930 – 1933 (Great Depression ): Sales drop from $34 million to $8.2 million, and the number of employees dropped from 6,100 to 2,400.

== Independence from Western Electric ==
- 1949: an antitrust suit in the U.S. forces AT&T/Western Electric to sell its stake in Northern Electric to Bell Canada. Deprived of its Western Electric tie, Northern starts developing its own products.
- 1953: Northern Electric produces its first television sets using tubes made by RCA.
- 1964: Bell Canada acquires 100 percent of Northern Electric
- 1966: the Northern Electric research lab, Northern Electric Laboratories (the predecessor to Bell-Northern Research), starts looking into the possibilities of fiber optic cable
- 1969: work begins on digitizing telephone communications.
- 1969: Northern begins making inroads into the U.S. market with its switching systems.
- 1972: Northern opens its first factory in the U.S. in Michigan.
- 1972: Northern begins shipping the SG-1 'Pulse' PBX, a PAM TDM PBX with digital control.
- 1975: Northern begins shipping its first digital switching systems, one of the earliest such systems to be sold.
- Early 70’: Northern Telecom is, with Bell-Northern Research, a part owner of MicroSystems International a semiconductor manufacturer based in Kanata, outside Ottawa.

== Northern Telecom and "Digital World" ==
- 1976: Northern Electric Company name changed to Northern Telecom Limited.
- 1976: "Digital World" three-page advertisement appears in major trade publications
- 1977, Nortel introduces its DMS line of digital central office telephone switches
- 1984: AT&T breakup
- 1985: Northern Telecom becomes the first non-Japanese supplier to Nippon Telegraph and Telephone. The NT DMS-1 would make up 0.6% of NTT's inventory.

== Deregulation ==
- 1983: Due to deregulation, Bell Canada Enterprises is formed as the parent company to Bell Canada and Northern Telecom. Bell-Northern Research is jointly owned 50–50 by Bell Canada and Northern Telecom. The combined three companies are referred to as the tricorporate.
- 1995: Northern Telecom becomes Nortel, the streamlined identity it adopts for its 100th anniversary.

== Optical boom and the Right Angle Turn ==
- 1998: company's name is changed to Nortel Networks
- 1998: Nortel acquires Bay Networks
- 1998: BCE ceases to be the majority shareholder of Nortel.
- late 1990s: share price of Nortel stock reaches unheard-of levels despite the company's repeated failure to turn a profit.
- 2000: Nortel accounts for more than a third of the total valuation of all the companies listed on the Toronto Stock Exchange (TSX), employing 94,500 worldwide, with 25,900 in Canada alone.
- 2000: BCE spins out Nortel, distributing its holdings of Nortel to its shareholders. Bell-Northern Research is gradually absorbed into Nortel.
- 2000: John Roth (CEO) cashes in his own stock options for a personal gain of C$135 million
- 2000-2002: Nortel's market capitalization fell from C$398 billion in September 2000 to less than C$5 billion in August 2002, as Nortel's stock price plunges from C$124 to C$0.47.
- 2001: CEO John Roth retires, replaced by Chief financial officer Frank Dunn. Dunn would be fired "for cause"

== After the Internet bubble ==
=== Frank Dunn CEO - accounting restatements ===
- 2001-2003: Two-thirds of Nortel's workforce (60,000 staff) are laid off
- 2001: writedowns of nearly US$16 billion
- 2003: temporary return to profitability resulting in $70 million in bonuses awarded to the top 43 managers, with $7.8 million going to Dunn alone, $3 million to chief financial officer Douglas Beatty, and $2 million to controller Michael Gollogly.
- Independent auditor Deloitte & Touche advises audit committee chairman John Cleghorn and board chairman "Red" Wilson to look into the suspicious results, who promptly hired the law firm WilmerHale to vet the financial statements.
- October 2003, Nortel announces its intention to restate approximately $900 million of liabilities carried on its previously reported balance sheet resulting in a reduction in previously reported net losses for 2000, 2001, and 2002 and an increase in shareholders’ equity and net assets previously reported on its balance sheet.
- A dozen of the company's most senior executives return $8.6 million of bonuses they were paid based on the erroneous accounting.
- Investigators find about $3 billion in revenue was booked improperly in 1998, 1999, and 2000.
- More than $2 billion is moved into later years, about $750 million pushed forward beyond 2003 and about $250 million is wiped away completely.
- 2003: Nortel reaches an agreement with Export Development Canada for it to provide Nortel with a credit support facility of up to US$750 million.
- April 28, 2004: Dunn, Beatty, and Gollogly are fired "for cause" relating to "accountability for financial reporting".
- March, September 2007: The SEC charges eight former Nortel executives with civil fraud. Three junior executives settled, paying fines.
- June 19, 2008: The RCMP charges Dunn, Beatty, and Gollogly with criminal fraud for manipulating financial results.
- January 16, 2012: The criminal trial begins.
- January 14, 2013: Dunn, Beatty, and Gollogly found not guilty of fraud.
- December 19, 2014: The SEC dismisses all remaining claims.

=== Owens and Zafirovski ===
- After Dunn's firing, retired United States Admiral Bill Owens – at the time a member of the board of directors – was appointed interim CEO.
- Nortel Networks subsequently returned to using the Nortel name for branding purposes only (the official company name was not changed).
- June 2005: Nortel acquires PEC Solutions, a provider of information technology and telecommunications services to various government agencies and departments, and renames it Nortel Government Solutions Incorporated (NGS).
- August, 2005: LG Electronics and Nortel formed a joint venture, with Nortel owning 50% plus one share, to offer telecom and networking solutions in the wireline, optical, wireless and enterprise areas for South Korean and global customers.
- Peter W. Currie, previously the Chief Financial Officer (CFO) of the Royal Bank of Canada, was named CFO of Nortel in 2005, having previously served as Northern Telecom's CFO in the 1990s.
- Gary Daichendt, the former Chief Operating Officer of Cisco Systems, was hired as president and COO, and was expected to succeed Owens as CEO.
- Shortly afterward, Daichendt appointed ex-Cisco Chief Science Officer Gary Kunis as Chief Technology Officer (CTO). Both Garys were concerned about the overall direction of Nortel, especially when compared to Cisco, their previous employer.
- Three months later, Daichendt resigned after both his restructuring plan and his suggestion that Owens and Currie leave the company immediately were rejected by the board of directors.
- Kunis quit shortly thereafter.
- At the year's end, directors Lynton "Red" Wilson and John Cleghorn retired from the board.
- Mike S. Zafirovski, who had served as president and CEO of GE Lighting and then as Motorola President and COO, succeeded Owens as president and CEO on November 15, 2005.
- Motorola filed a suit against Zafirovski's hiring, alleging that his new position would break the terms of the non-disclosure agreement he had signed. Nortel agreed to pay $11.5 million on his behalf to settle the lawsuit.
- Nortel also paid out US$575 million and 629 million common shares in 2006 to settle a class-action lawsuit that accused the company of misleading investors about the company's health.
- Peter W. Currie stepped down as Executive Vice President and CFO in early 2007.
- February 2007: Nortel announces its plans to reduce its workforce by 2,000 employees, and to transfer an additional 1,000 jobs to lower-cost job sites.
- The Securities and Exchange Commission files civil fraud charges against Nortel for accounting fraud from 2000 to 2003; the fraud was allegedly to close gaps between its true performance, its internal targets and Wall Street expectations.
- Nortel settles the case, paying $35 million, which the Commission distributes to affected shareholders, and reports periodically to the commission on remedial measures to improve its financial accounting.
- Nortel announces plans in February 2008 to eliminate 2,100 jobs, and to transfer another 1,000 jobs to lower-cost centres.
- As part of the reductions, Nortel shut down its Calgary campus in 2009.
- During its reporting of third quarter 2008 results, Nortel announced it would restructure into three vertically integrated business units: Enterprise, Carrier Networks, and Metro Ethernet Networks.
- As part of the decentralization of its organization, four executive positions were eliminated, effective January 1, 2009: Chief Marketing Officer Lauren Flaherty, Chief Technology Officer John Roese, Global Services President Dietmar Wendt, and Executive Vice President Global Sales Bill Nelson.
- A net reduction of 1,300 jobs was also announced. As its stock price dropped below $1, the New York Stock Exchange notified Nortel that it would be delisted if its common shares failed to rise above $1 per share within 6 months.
- Rumours continue to persist of Nortel's poor financial health, amid the late 2000s recession, and its bids for government funds are turned down.

== Liquidation ==
=== Protection from creditors ===
- January 14, 2009: Nortel files for protection from creditors, in the United States under Chapter 11 of the United States Bankruptcy Code, in Canada under the Companies' Creditors Arrangement Act, and in the United Kingdom under the Insolvency Act 1986.
- Nortel's share price falls more than 79% on the Toronto Stock Exchange.
- Nortel is the first major technology company to seek bankruptcy protection during the 2008 financial crisis.
- Nortel had an interest payment of $107 million due the next day, approximately 4.6% of its cash reserves of approximately $2.3 billion.
- Export Development Canada agrees to provide up to C$30 million in short-term financing through its existing credit support facility with Nortel.
- The Canadian government resists characterizing its position on Nortel as a bailout.
- Nortel pays out retention bonuses to almost 1,000 top executives, totalling up to US$45 million.
- Severance payments to employees laid off prior to the creditor protection filing are being withheld.
- End of January 2009: Nortel announces that it would be discontinuing its WiMAX business and its joint agreement with Alvarion.
- Nortel sells its Layer 4–7 application delivery business to Israeli technology firm Radware for $18 million, after Radware has initially placed a stalking horse bid. Nortel had acquired the application switch product line in October 2000 when it purchased Alteon WebSystems.

=== Wind-up ===
- June 2009: Nortel announces that it no longer plans to emerge from bankruptcy protection, and is seeking buyers for all of its business units.
- June 26, 2009 : Nortel shares are delisted from the Toronto Stock Exchange at a price of $0.185 per share.
- August 2009: Mike Zafirovski resigns
- August 2009: Nortel's board of directors reorganized with three members instead of nine.
- 2009: Nortel hands out $14.2 million in cash compensation to seven executives
- 2009: Nortel pays out $1.4 million to 10 former and current directors
- 2009: Nortel pays $140 million to lawyers, pension, human resources and financial experts helping to oversee the company's bankruptcy proceedings.
- July 2009: Ericsson purchases Nortel's CDMA and LTE assets for $1.13 billion in an auction.
- July 20, 2009: Avaya wins an auction for Nortel's Enterprise Solutions business, including Nortel's stake in Nortel Government Solutions and DiamondWare, for $900 million, after having placed a stalking horse bid of $475 million.
- November 2009: Nortel sells its MEN (Metro Ethernet Networks) unit to Ciena Corporation for US$530 million in cash and US$239 million in convertible notes,
- November 2009: Nortel sells its GSM business at auction to Ericsson and Kapsch for US$103 million.
- December 8, 2009: Hitachi purchases the Next Generation Packet Core assets.
- December 2009: John Roth (former CEO )files for a US$1 billion indemnification from Nortel, joining the list of U.S. creditors.
- February 2010: Ernst & Young, the court-appointed monitor of Nortel's Canadian bankruptcy proceedings, reports that the assets of Nortel's Health and Welfare Trust had a shortfall of $37 million in its net assets as of December 31, 2008. The trust supports pensioners' medical, dental and life insurance benefits, as well as income support for some groups such as long-term disability recipients.
- February 2010: Nortel negotiates a $57-million deal to wind up the health care and other benefits provided to former Canadian employees.
- February 2010: Nortel proposes spending $92.3M on retention bonuses for 1,475 employees in its Nortel Business Services and Corporate groups, with $2.5 million in incentives going to Christopher Ricaute, president of Nortel Business Services; $27 million allocated for Canadian employees; and $55 million allocated for U.S. employees.
- March 2010: US trustee Roberta DeAngelis objects to the payment of $55.6 million to 866 employees.
- Court-appointed representatives for Nortel's former employees in Canada, who are creditors in the Ontario bankruptcy court, have signed an agreement to not oppose any employee incentive program.
- May 2010: Genband purchases the Carrier VoIP and Application Solutions (CVAS) unit, as Nortel accepted its stalking horse bid of $282 million, with adjustments that decreased the net sale price to about $100 million, without a formal bidding process.
- June 2010: Ericsson purchases Nortel's share in its joint venture with LG Electronics for US$242 million, forming LG-Ericsson.
- September 2010 : Ericsson purchases Nortel's final operating unit, the Multi-Service Switch division, for US$65 million.
- October 2010 : Nortel's Ottawa campus on Carling Avenue is purchased by Public Works and Government Services Canada (PWGSC) for a cash purchase price of CDN$208 million.
- December 2010: Nortel's 53.13% stake in Turkish company Nortel Netaş was acquired by One Equity Partners (OEP) and Rhea Investments for $68 million.
- approximately 6,000 patents and patent applications encompassing technologies such as wireless, wireless 4G, data networking, optical, voice, Internet, and semiconductors, are sold for $4.5 billion to a consortium including Apple, EMC, Ericsson, Microsoft, Research In Motion, and Sony, pending American and Canadian court approval.(Google had placed the initial stalking horse bid of $900 million and later upped the bid to $1,902,160,540, then $2,614,972,128, and eventually $3.14159 billion, which are references to Brun's constant, Meissel–Mertens constant, and pi.)
- October 2011: Bankruptcy filings state that Nortel owes former Canadian engineers $285,000 for patent awards that were not paid.
- October 2011, the administrators of Nortel's British subsidiary lose their appeal to overturn a court order requiring them to pay £2.1 billion into Nortel's underfunded pension plan.
- January 2017, judges in Delaware and Canada approve a plan to pay more than $7 billion to creditors of Nortel Networks thus ending one of the longest and most expensive Chapter 11 cases.
