= List of Nortel people =

This is a list of people associated with Nortel, a Canadian telecommunications manufacturer.

== Directors ==
- Jalynn Bennett
- James Blanchard
- John Cleghorn – a former audit committee chairperson
- Frank Dunn
- Yves Fortier
- Kristina M. Johnson
- Ralph Holley Keefler
- John A MacNaughton
- John Manley
- Richard D. McCormick
- William Owens
- John Roth
- Guylaine Saucier
- Lynton Wilson
- Mike S. Zafirovski

== Employees ==
- Bill Conner
- Michael Cowpland
- Whitfield Diffie
- Frank Dunn
- Mohamed Elmasry
- Lauren Flaherty
- Robert Gaskins
- Maureen Govern
- Vinita Gupta
- Ric Holt
- Ralph Holley Keefler
- Chris Lewis
- Walter Frederick Light
- Vernon Oswald Marquez
- Terry Matthews
- William Owens
- Kathleen Peterson
- James M. Phillips
- John Roth
- Edward Fleetford Sise
- Paul Fleetford Sise
- Mike S. Zafirovski
