= List of Nortel products =

This is a list of products formerly manufactured by Nortel, a defunct Canadian telecommunications manufacturer:

- 1-Meg Modem
- Agile Communication Environment
- Nortel Application Server 5300
- Digital Multiplex System
- DMS-100
- Nortel ERS 5500
- Nortel ERS 8600
- Nortel IP Phone 1140E
- Nortel Meridian
- Meridian Mail
- Meridian Norstar
- Metro Ethernet Routing Switch 8600
- Multiservice Switch
- Nortel FAST Stacking
- Nortel Speech Server
- Nortel Optical Multiservice Edge 6500
- Passport Carrier Release
- Portable Commutator
- Nortel Secure Router 4134
- SP-1 switch

== Nortel telephones ==
- Nortel IP Phone 1140E
- Nortel business phones
- Nortel payphones
- Northern Telecom home phones
