= Bell-Northern Research =

Telecommunications research company

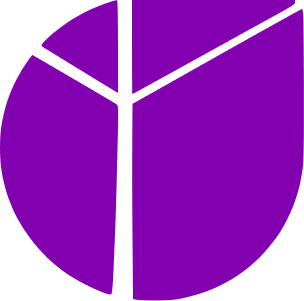
- Type: Private
- Industry: Telecommunications, Networking
- Founded: 1971
- Fate: Folded into Nortel Networks R&D
- Headquarters: Ottawa, Ontario
- Products: Telecommunications equipment; Telephone exchange; Computer networking; Wireless telecommunications; Optical networking; Telecommunications software; Microelectronics; Semiconductors
- Number of employees: 10,000 (1996)
- Parent: Nortel Networks (50%) (1971-1996); Bell Canada (50%) (1971-1996)
- Website: www.bnr.ca

Bell-Northern Research (BNR) was a telecommunications research and development company established in 1971 when Bell Canada and Northern Electric combined their R&D organizations. It was jointly owned by Bell Canada and Northern Telecom. BNR was absorbed into Nortel Networks when that company changed its name from Northern Telecom in the mid-1990s.

BNR was based at the Carling Campus in Ottawa, Ontario, Canada, with campuses at locations around the world, including Research Triangle Park, North Carolina; Richardson, Texas; Ann Arbor, Michigan; and Harlow and Maidenhead, United Kingdom. Bell-Northern Research pioneered the development of digital technology, and created the first practical digital PBX, (SL1), and central office (DMS). Under the direction of then Nortel Chief Executive Officer, John Roth, BNR lost its separate identity in the 1990s, and was folded into the Nortel R&D organization.

== History ==
For much of its early history, Bell Canada operated as the Canadian division of the Bell System. Development and manufacturing of their various telephony products generally took place in the US, and then, to avoid duty, were manufactured in Canada at their Northern Electric subsidiary (which would later become Nortel Networks), the Canadian analog to the US Western Electric.

=== Pre-1970s ===
Northern Electric spun off a subsidiary in 1934, Dominion Sound Equipment, originally to develop equipment for sound in movies. Over time, the division evolved in an attempt to use its design talent and manufacturing ability on third party projects. In 1937, this aspect became the Special Products Division. For many years the SPD was used as Bell Canada's R&D arm, although as before, most telephony designs were created at Bell Labs in the US.

In 1949, the United States Justice department attempted to force AT&T to divest itself of its Western Electric subsidiary. As a result of this legal action, Western Electric sold its shares in Northern Electric to Bell Canada. In 1957, Northern Electric started its own research and development labs in Belleville, Ontario. Two years later, Northern Electric created the Northern Electric Research and Development Laboratories in Ottawa.

=== 1970s ===
In 1971, Bell Canada and Northern Electric combined their R&D organizations and formed Bell-Northern Research.

BNR's researchers pioneered the view that a telephone switch (PBX or Central Office) was best regarded as a special form of real-time computer, a view that was considered to be highly innovative in the 1970s. Although George Stibitz had foreseen this evolution at AT&T in the 1930s, subsequent generations of engineers, prior to the 1970s, regarded the switch as a piece of hardware, best hard-wired, to handle the basic telephone call where two parties connect, speak and hang up.

In the 1960s, however, this view was coming under a great deal of strain. Increasingly, telephone users wanted to conference call, forward, and record voice greetings, so common today. Such features required more flexibility in the controller, leading to the development of computer-controlled switching machines, notably the Bell Labs − Western Electric 1ESS. These early machines still had an analog, usually electromechanical switching matrix because the technology of the time did not permit the cost-effective dedication of a filter-codec to each subscriber. (Transmission systems had already gone digital, for example the D4 carrier system.)

Northern Electric introduced its first electronic central office system in 1969 with the SP1. The SP1 had a fully computer-based electronic control system, thus the name "SP", short for "stored program". Its switching matrix was still electromechanical. Rather than the reed relay matrix of the 1ESS, it used the minibar, a version of the crossbar switch.

BNR was, with Northern Telecom, a part owner of MicroSystems International a semiconductor manufacturer based in Kanata, outside Ottawa.

==== The Digital Switch ====
BNR introduced the Meridian SL-1 in 1975, the world's first all-digital PABX aimed at medium-sized businesses. The SL-1 was fully digital in both control and switching. As such the SL-1 was smaller, much more reliable, and offered many more features than an equivalent electromechanical system. The SL-1 design evolved into Meridian-1, and subsequently the CS1000x as Nortel's private network (or enterprise) flagship offering.

The SP-1 design was superseded by the DMS-100 central office switch and other members of the DMS family of products (DMS: digital multiplex switch). DMS extended the technology by fully integrating switching and transmission. This was a major advance that changed the way systems were built.

BNR's products were architecturally based on Complex Instruction Set (CISC) architectures prevalent in the 1970s, and on a series of underlying technologies. This was greatly influenced by the late 1970s success of the DEC VAX computer, a highly "elegant" and rather layered technology, realizable in a range of power. In the early 1990s, under Nortel CEO Jean Monty, the software for the flagship DMS product was segmented into layers ('Base', 'Telecom', and 'IEC' or Inter-Exchange Carrier) to improve maintainability of the product. The IEC layers were customer-specific, targeted towards Sprint, MCI, and a large group of small "United Carrier" companies that were subsequently swallowed up by Worldcom. Once the IEC layer was established, customer-specific releases could occur quarterly, whereas Telecom and Base programming was for baked-in code that only had infrequent, maintenance updates.

=== 1980s ===
Through the 1980s attention turned from pure hardware to software development. The BNR Toronto lab introduced Meridian Mail in the 1980s, which went on to be a very successful product and forced the introduction of similar products from other telephony vendors. They later added automatic call distribution and other similar services.

At its zenith in the early 1980s, when it opened R&D centers in Mountain View, Ann Arbor and later in Research Triangle Park and Richardson, Texas, BNR's notable American employees included Whitfield Diffie, a noted authority on cryptography, and Robert Gaskins, who invented PowerPoint after leaving BNR, influenced in part by BNR's response to the very cumbersome presentation tools used by his department there. J.W.J. Williams, the inventor of Heapsort was also an influential figure in the development of digital switching.

As part of its internal IT infrastructure, BNR also created an email system called COCOS (COrporate COmmunication System), and a powerful relational database system called GERM (General Entity-Relationship Model).

BNR also had labs in Maidenhead, England, Montreal, Quebec, Edmonton, Alberta, Wollongong, Australia, and Tokyo, Japan; as well as Atlanta, Georgia and Ann Arbor, Michigan.

=== 1990s ===
With the formation of Bell Canada Enterprises (later shortened to BCE) in 1983 as the parent company of Bell Canada and Northern Telecom, BNR in Canada was jointly owned 50-50 by Bell Canada and Nortel. Nortel assumed a majority share in BNR in 1996, and BNR was gradually folded into Nortel, which acquired the remainder of BNR when BCE divested itself of Nortel. Unfortunately, the collapse in demand for Nortel products in the wake of the bursting of the dot-com bubble, which occurred after aggressive spending on acquisitions and hiring under CEO John Roth, required Nortel to trim its workforce from 96,000 (in 2001) to 35,000 people (as of 2006).

== See also ==
- Nortel Networks
- Bell Canada
- Nortel Retirees and former employees Protection Canada (NRPC)
