= NRPC =

NRPC may refer to:

- National Railroad Passenger Corporation, the legal company name of Amtrak
- National Reconciliation and Peace Centre
- Nortel Retirees and former employees Protection Canada
