= Edmund B. Fitzgerald =

American businessman (1926–2013)

- Born: February 5, 1926; Milwaukee, Wisconsin, US
- Died: August 28, 2013 (aged 87); Nashville, Tennessee, US
- Burial place: Forest Home Cemetery
- Education: Deerfield Academy ('44); University of Michigan (BSE '46)
- Spouse: Elisabeth McKee Christensen (m. 1947)
- Military career
- Branch: United States Marine Corps
- Service years: 1943–46, 1950–52
- Rank: Captain
- Conflicts: World War II; Korean War

Edmund Bacon Fitzgerald (February 5, 1926 – August 28, 2013) was an American business executive from Wisconsin and was a key figure in bringing major league baseball back to Milwaukee in the form of the Milwaukee Brewers in 1970.

== Early life and education ==
Fitzgerald was born in 1926 in Milwaukee, Wisconsin. He attended the Milwaukee Country Day School, the Deerfield Academy and the University of Michigan. He served in the United States Marine Corps from 1943 to 1946 and from 1950 to 1952.

== Endeavors ==
=== Business endeavors ===
Fitzgerald was chief executive officer of Cutler-Hammer, Inc. for 15 years. During the 1980s, he was chairman and CEO of Nortel. He was also director of the Business Council on National Issues in Canada for four years. He also was on the board of trustees for Northwestern Mutual Life Insurance Company, First Wisconsin National Bank and Beloit College.

=== Baseball endeavors ===
Fitzgerald co-founded the Milwaukee Brewers in 1970, at various times Vice President and General Partner on the club until 1982. During the 1970s, he was on the Executive Council of Major League Baseball and chairman of its Player Relations Committee. He was previously a director on the board of the Milwaukee Braves and opposed the move to Atlanta.

=== Political and other endeavors ===
Fitzgerald was on the Industry Advisory Council to the U.S. Department of Defense and was President of the National Electrical Manufacturers Association. He was on President Ronald Reagan's National Security Telecommunications Advisory Committee and was a life trustee and chairman on the Committee for Economic Development. Due to his efforts to improve trade relations between the United States and Japan, Fitzgerald was awarded the Order of the Rising Sun, 2nd Class. He also was a member of the U.S.-Korea Wisemen Council.

== Family ==
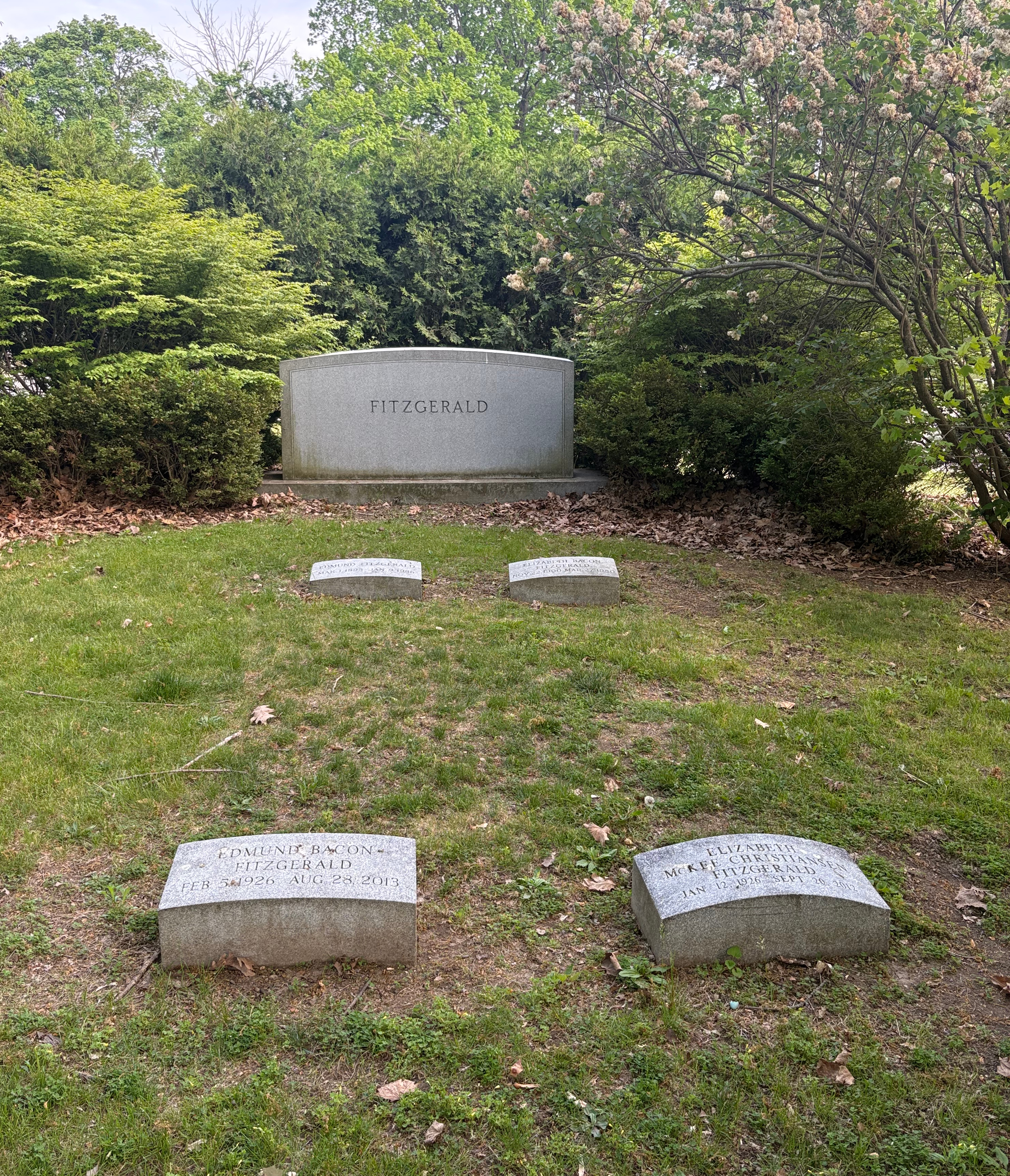
Graves of Fitzgerald, his wife, father, and mother at Forest Home Cemetery

Fitzgerald's father, also named Edmund Fitzgerald (1895–1986), was a civic leader who was chairman of the Northwestern Mutual Life Insurance Company, and was the eponym for the Great Lakes ore carrier SS Edmund Fitzgerald, popularized in the 1976 song "The Wreck of the Edmund Fitzgerald" by Gordon Lightfoot. His grandfather, William E. Fitzgerald (1859–1901), was a famous shipbuilder, and his maternal grandfather Frank R. Bacon (1872–1949) co-founded Cutler-Hammer.

Edmund B. Fitzgerald died in Nashville, Tennessee on August 28, 2013, and was buried at Forest Home Cemetery in Milwaukee.
