= Avaya Unified Communications Management =

Line of GUI software programs from Avaya

- Developer: Nortel (now Avaya)
- Operating system: Windows and Linux
- Type: Communication software

Avaya Unified Communications Management in Computer Networking is the name of a collection of GUI software programs from Avaya. It uses a service-oriented architecture (SOA) that serves as a foundation for unifying the configuration and monitoring of Avaya Unified Communications Servers and data systems.

== History ==
=== Origins ===
These management tools were originally named and created by Synoptics, carried on by Bay Networks, and later updated with the family name Unified Communications Management by Nortel. The products, in a similar fashion as the Optivity product predecessors, are notable for their innovative use of a web browser-based user interface not only for access to network management data, but also for the configuration of the network. This was something that, heretofore, was only possible with an installed binary application.

=== Version history ===
In June 1996, release 7.0 included the Optivity Network Management System, which included version 7.0 which provided SNMP-based auto-discovery of the data network switches, analysis, planning tools, policy services, and telephony management. This management tool was rated very highly by Info World with an analysis of the tools from Bay Networks, HP, 3Com, and Network General Solutions, with HP Open View receiving the highest marks.

== Capabilities ==
The products in the Unified Communications Management (UCM) suite integrate into the same SOA-based Web Services framework to provide a comprehensive [7] set of management capabilities all available through a web browser [8] single sign-on. Web browser [9] sessions of the Unified Communications Management Suite use HTTP Secure sessions to provide access to the UCM Home Page. From the UCM Home page, each user can access any of the UCM applications by clicking on the application link from the navigation bar on the left-hand side of the page.

=== Visualization Performance and Fault Manager ===
Visualization of the Network Topology: VPFM is able to perform autodiscovery [10] of the wireless, WAN, LAN, and VoIP network infrastructure as well as Servers, end-node Node Devices, and Printers. VPFM has a Path Trace Capability that provides functionality to see the physical network connectivity from the end-node Node Device to the server it may be trying to access. This provides more functionality than a traceroute in that the graphical path trace functionality is able to show Split Multilink Trunk physical connections and related statistics down the path being diagnosed. Diagnostic tools such as trending can be used to observe errors and traffic levels down each link in the Split Multilink Trunk.

Auto Trending – Capacity Planning and Reporting is an important feature of a network management system in order for the operator to respond to network utilization and growth. Upon auto-discovery of the physical slot/port connectivity of the entire network, VPFM is able to understand which connections link the network together. VPFM automatically enables the trending of Key Resource Indicators and Key Performance Indicators to provide historical views of things like errors, congestion, utilization in/out of the important trunk links of the switch by slot and port. These interface trends allow the operator to determine if the conditions that are being encountered at the current time are atypical or not. VPFM also enables Key Performance Indicator trending at the overall switch level as well to provide a view into the routing stability, physical connection stability, bridging stability, and CPU utilization among other key statistics.

VoIP Monitoring and Quality Management – Visualization Performance and Fault Manager provides the capabilities to monitor the traffic levels to key Voice over IP equipment.

VPFM can also receive and display Syslog Messages from Network Devices. VPFM has the ability to forward events and send email notifications when critical issues occur. This function coupled with event de-duplication and correlation makes email notifications effective without flooding mobile devices with too many events. It provides a GUI software network management system to discover and manage network attached devices. It transforms complex networks into physical and logical views to allow the operators to identify application or network issues.

=== Configuration Orchestration Manager ===
Device Firmware or System Image Upgrades – Configuration and Orchestration Manager can be used to automate the task of device firmware upgrades, for operational or security enhancement purposes. Network Devices can be grouped together through multiple criteria such as core or network edge location. Upgrades can be done from edge to core to ensure successful communication to switches being upgraded thereby preventing communications failures due to switches being randomly upgraded. This prevents the situation where the edge switch behind the core switch is attempted to be upgraded.

=== Enterprise Policy Manager ===
Enterprise Policy Manager, formerly known as Optivity Policy Services supports the identification of network traffic based on several criteria such as IP Address, TCP or UDP port number, or VLAN Number

Centralized ACLs for Filtering and QoS – VPFM provides the ability to monitor the traffic levels on the many links that connect a network together for excessive utilization or error rates. This information can be used in conjunction with flows observed in IP Flow Manager to create Roles and Policies within Enterprise Policy Manager against these links on the switches referred to as a Policy Decision Point or PDP.

== See also ==
- Service-oriented architecture
