= 1-Meg Modem =

DSL modem created by Nortel

The 1-Meg Modem in telecommunications was a DSL modem created by Nortel which conforms to the ADSL Lite standard. The 1-Meg Modem was the first xDSL modem to gain approval and registration under FCC Part 68 Rules.

== History ==
At the time the modem was released on August 8, 1997, telephone companies were fearing competition from cable modems. However, early DSL technology was too costly for wide deployment. By October 1998 Nortel claimed more than $1 billion in sales which, in their words, had "the potential for more than one million end-user lines." The modems were originally tested at Northern Illinois University dormitories and worked well even though the school's wiring was relatively old.

== Description ==
The 1-Meg Modem can be deployed up to 18,000 feet (5,500 m) from the central office providing a downstream bit rate of 960 kilobits per second (kbit/s) and a maximum upstream rate of 120 kbit/s over 24 gauge wire. The second generation could achieve a transfer rate of 1280 kbit/s downstream and 320 kbit/s upstream. Unlike most ADSL modems which use Asynchronous Transfer Mode (ATM) virtual circuits to carry data, the 1-Meg Modem used Ethernet which makes the product easy for most residential users to install themselves but ill-suited for applications that require quality of service to be enforced. At the telephone company switch the installation was relatively simple when the switch was a Nortel DMS Switch. The customer's line card must be swapped with a line card that supported the 1-Meg Modem, and also a card must be added to the drawer that would manage all data from the 1-Meg Modem cards in the drawer.

== See also ==
- Bell 101 modem
