= Nortel Meridian =

Popular PBX telephone system

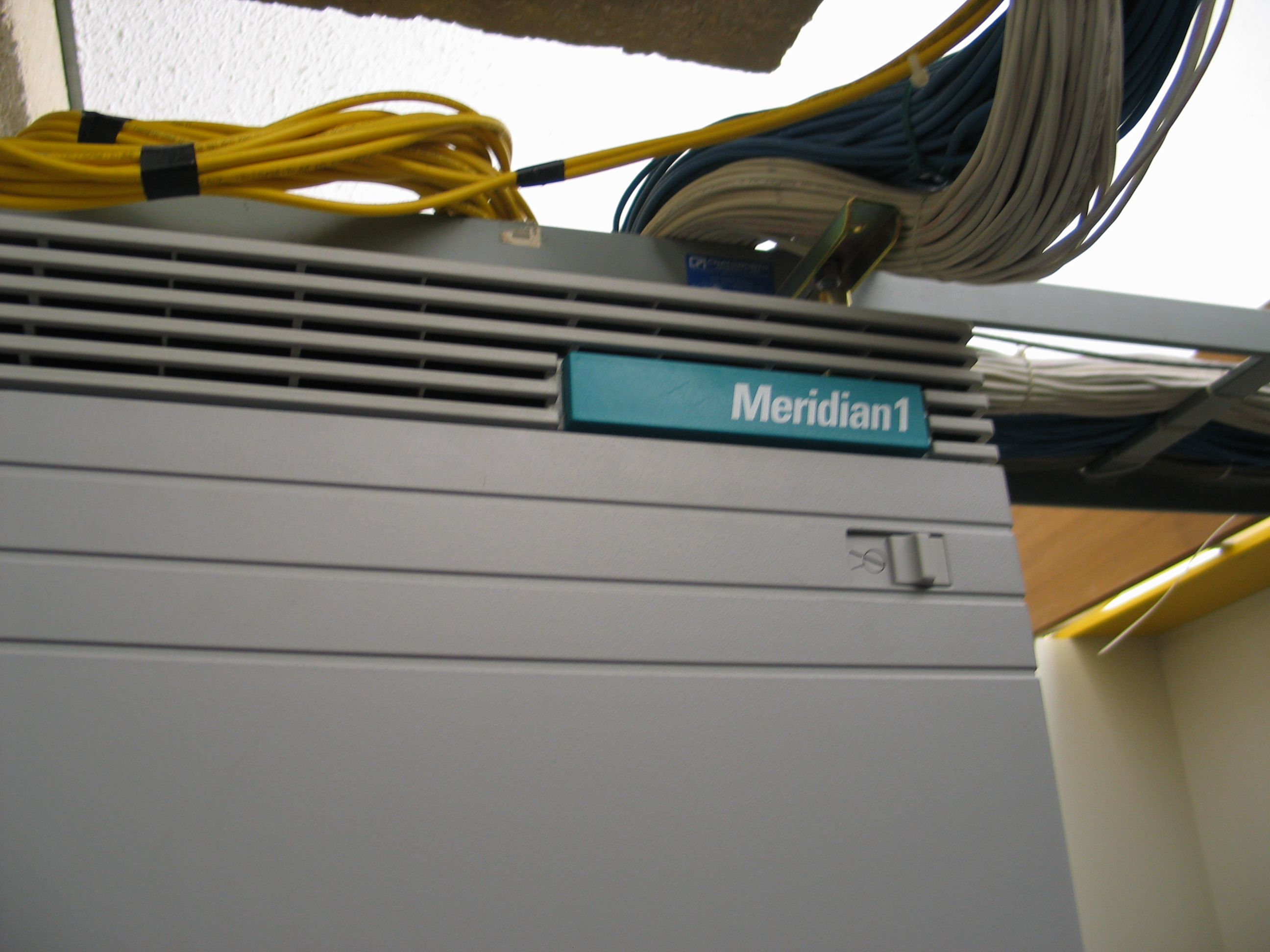
A Meridian 1 at Parkway North High School

Nortel Meridian is a private branch exchange telephone switching system. It provides advanced voice features, data connectivity, LAN communications, computer telephony integration (CTI), and information services for communication applications ranging from 60 to 80,000 lines.

== History ==
Exploratory development on digital technology, common for the SL-1 (PBX) and the DMS (public switch) product lines, began in 1969 at Northern Telecom, while R&D activities related to the SL-1 started in 1971. SL stands for Stored Logic.

The original products were developed in a Bell-Northern Research developed proprietary toolset and language, similar to Pascal called Protel, and ran without a specific operating system. In the 1990s it was evolved onto VxWorks, a commercial real time embedded operating system, at which time the model numbers were evolved to add the letter C to the end of the option numbers.

It was introduced by Northern Telecom during the USITA convention in San Francisco held from September 7 to September 9 1974. With an original capacity from 100 to 7,600 lines, it became the first fully digital PBX announced on the global market aimed at the smaller PBX market. In the early 1970s, most PBXs were either electromechanical (e.g. cross-bar) or based on a hybrid technology (e.g. switching matrix made from a two-dimensional array of contacts but control performed by an electronic logic). For this reason, the SL-1 enjoyed a great success on the enterprise market both in North-America and globally.

Its success went on to power the company into a leadership position in the telephony world, and led to expanded designs "up and down" to provide products at all sizes, including the DMS series high-end machines, and the Meridian Norstar for smaller installations up to 200 users. The SL-1 was gradually enhanced (peripheral hardware, packaging, etc.) and renamed Meridian-1 in the late 1980s. The Meridian-1 has evolved to support IP telephony and other next generation IP services.

== Impact ==
The Meridian has 43 million installed users worldwide, making it the most widely used PBX.

The Meridian was one of the few PBXs still available from a major communications supplier that can be configured as non-VOIP PBX and could be upgraded to a hybrid system with VoIP added.

== Models ==
The Meridian 1 range currently consists of several models:

- Meridian 1 Option 11C (60-800 lines)
- Meridian 1 Option 11C Mini (60-128 lines)
- Meridian 1 Option 61C (600-2000 lines)
- Meridian 1 Option 81C (200-16,000 lines)

Additionally, other products have been sold using the Meridian brand:

- The Norstar key telephone system was sold as the Meridian Norstar in some markets, until the mid-1990s
- A large-scale switch based on the DMS-100 is sold as the Meridian SL-100

Resellers, and accessory manufacturers frequently but erroneously use the phrase "Meridian Option" to refer to the Meridian 1 range, to distinguish it from the smaller and larger Norstar and SL-100

== Digital Line Card ==
A digital line card is an intelligent peripheral equipment (IPE) device which can be installed in the IPE module. It provides 16 voice and 16 data communication links between a Meridian 1 switch and modular digital telephones.

The digital line card supports voice only or simultaneous voice and data service over a single twisted pair of standard telephone wiring. When a Meridian digital telephone is equipped with the data option, an asynchronous ASCII terminal, or a PC acting as an asynchronous ASCII terminal, can be connected to the system through the digital telephone.

=== Physical description ===
Digital line cards are housed in the Intelligent Peripheral Equipment (IPE) Modules. Up to 16 cards are supported.

The digital line card circuitry is mounted on a 31.75 cm by 25.40 cm (12.5 in by 10 in) double-sided printed circuit board. The card connects to the backplane through a 160-pin edge connector. The faceplate of the digital line card is equipped with a red LED that lights when the card is disabled.

When the card is installed, the LED remains lit for two to five seconds as a self-test runs. If the self-test completes successfully, the LED flashes three times and remains lit until the card is configured and enabled in software, then the LED goes out. If the LED continually flashes or remains weakly lit, there is a fault detected in the card.

=== Functional description ===
The digital line card is equipped with 16 identical digital line interfaces. Each interface provides a multiplexed voice, data, and signaling path to and from a digital terminal (telephone) over a 2-wire full duplex 512kHz time-division multiplexing digital link. Each digital telephone and associated data terminal is assigned a separate Terminal Number (TN) in the system database, giving a total of 32 addressable units per card.

=== References ===
Extracts from Nortel IP Telephony

== TCM Loop ==
Time Compression Multiplexing (TCM) is the standard communication protocol used by Nortel digital telephones on a 2-wire tip and ring circuit. Each digital phone line terminates at a station port on a Digital Voice Card (DVC) in the PBX. The circuit interface operates by a transformer coupling which provides foreign voltage protection between the TCM loop and the digital line. The maximum length of a normal TCM loop is 300 m (1000 ft.) Minimum voltage at telephone 10 V DC and a TCM port should have between 15 and 20 V DC across the Tip and Ring with the phone disconnected. The port connection may be through a Punch-down block or a Modular connector called a TELADAPT plug (or socket) which is Nortel parlance for phone connector.

== Evolution Path ==
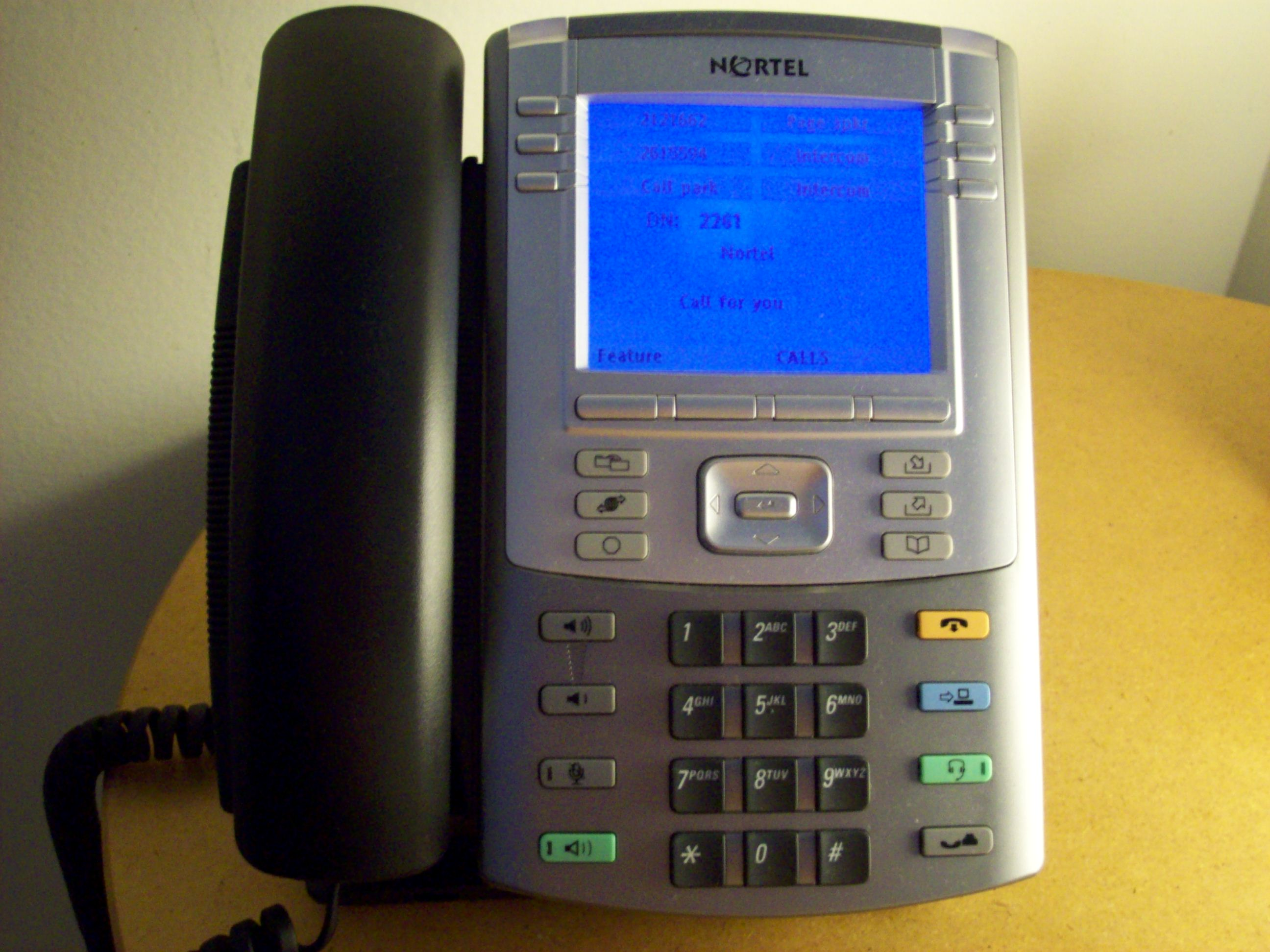
Current 1140E IP set for use on BCM and CS1000/2100 Nortel/Avaya systems

The Nortel Meridian 1 can be upgraded to support VoIP in two forms:

- VoIP Trunking, the Meridian 1 can have ITG-Trunk cards added to it to support PBX-to-PBX voice trunking using H.323
- VoIP Line (VoIP Sets), the Meridian 1 can have IP Line cards added to it to support VoIP sets.

The introduction of Release 3.0 for the Meridian 1, otherwise known as the CS1000 Release 3.0 also provides an upgrade path for the existing customer base to upgrade a Meridian 1 to an IP-PBX

- Introduction of E-MetroTel UCX4.5 MDSE package by leveraging MGC card, line cards and cabinets provides upgrade path for existing customers

== See also ==
- List of telephone switches
- Nortel business phones
- Portico TVA
