= Richard D. McCormick =

American business executive (born 1940)

Richard David McCormick (born July 4, 1940) is an American business executive. McCormick was the CEO of US West from 1990 to 1998. He was also a director for Wells Fargo & Company (1983-2010) and an honorary chairman to the International Chamber of Commerce (ICC).

== Biography ==
McCormick was born in Fort Dodge, Iowa, the son of Elmo Eugene McCormick and Virgilla (Lawler) McCormick. He received his BS degree in electrical engineering from Iowa State University in 1961. During his time as an undergraduate, he was a member of the Phi Gamma Delta fraternity. Post graduation, he went to work for AT&T as an engineer in Kansas City, Missouri.

On June 29, 1963, he married Mary Patricia Smola, and together they had four children.

He moved to Northwestern Bell in 1969, rising to the presidency of the Omaha based company in 1982. A year after the divestiture of the Bell System, he went to Denver in 1985 as executive vice president of US West, Inc., the new regional Bell operating company. McCormick was elected president and chief operating officer in 1986, chief executive officer in 1990, and a chairman in 1992 (replacing Jack A. MacAllister in both instances).

In 1995, McCormick was named chairman of the United States Council for International Business, the US affiliate of the International Chamber of Commerce. Later, he stepped down as chairman and was named vice chairman in February 2001. Elected chairman of the International Chamber of Commerce in 2001, he retired in 2003 and was given the emeritus title of honorary chairman.

Having been elected the director of Norwest Bank in 1983, upon the merger with Wells Fargo & Company in 1998, he became a director of Wells Fargo. McCormick retired as the CEO of US West in 1998 as well as the chairman in 1999. Solomon J. Trujillo replaced him as the chairman then. In January 1999, McCormick was appointed vice president of International Chamber of Commerce (ICC) and in January, 2001 he became the president of the body.

McCormick had been on the boards of Nortel Networks Corporation, United Technologies Corporation, Health Trio, UAL Corporation, Wells Fargo & Company, Unocal, and was a trustee for the Denver Art Museum.

Active in Republican politics, he has been a member of George W. Bush for President, Bush-Cheney in 2004, John McCain in 2008, the Freedom and Free Enterprise Political Action Committee.
