= Jalynn Bennett =

Canadian corporate director

Jalynn H. Bennett
- Born: 12 March 1943; Toronto, Ontario, Canada
- Died: 23 January 2015 (aged 71); Toronto, Ontario
- Education: Wellesley College; Trinity College, Toronto
- Known for: corporate director

Jalynn H. Bennett, CM (12 March 1943 – 23 January 2015) was a Canadian consultant and corporate director.

Over the course of her career, she was a member of the Board of Directors of Canadian Imperial Bank of Commerce, Nortel Networks, Teck Cominco, Sears Canada, Cadillac Fairview, Bombardier, Rexel Canada Electrical, CanWest Global Communications Corporation, Ontario Power Generation, Ontario Teachers' Pension Plan, Canada Millennium Scholarship Foundation, the Ontario government's Public Accountants Council, and the Hospital for Sick Children Foundation.

== Biography ==
Born in Toronto, Ontario, she attended Wellesley College from 1962 to 1963, before receiving a Bachelor of Arts degree in Economics from University of Trinity College in 1965.

She joined the Manufacturers Life Insurance Company eventually becoming the Vice President of Corporate Development from 1985 to 1989. In 1989, she founded her own consulting firm called Jalynn H. Bennett and Associates Limited which specializes in strategic planning and organizational development.

From 1989 to 1994, she was a Director of the Bank of Canada. From 1989 to 1994, she was a Commissioner of the Ontario Securities Commission. From 1994 to 1999, she was the Chair of the Trent University Board of Governors.

In 2000, she was made a Member of the Order of Canada for her "impressive financial career". In 1999, she was made a Fellow of the Institute of Corporate Directors. In 2004, she was awarded an honorary degree from University of Trinity College.
