= Nortel Speech Server =

The Nortel Speech Server (formerly known as Periphonics Speech Processing Platform) in telecommunications is a speech processing system that was originally developed by Nortel. Following the bankruptcy of Nortel, it is now sold by Avaya. The system is primarily used for large vocabulary speech recognition, natural language understanding, text-to-speech, and speaker verification.

The Nortel Speech Server was based on the Periphonics OSCAR platform. The original OSCAR Platform was based upon Solaris servers. The current range of Speech Servers is Windows based.

Nortel Speech Server is a component of the MPS 500, MPS 1000, and ICP platforms. On MPS systems, it may be used to stream prerecorded audio.

== See also ==
- Computational linguistics
