= Walter Frederick Light =

Canadian businessman (1923–1996)

- Born: 24 June 1923; Cobalt, Ontario
- Died: 24 February 1996 (aged 72); Toronto, Ontario
- Education: Queen's University (BSc '49)
- Spouse: Margaret Anne Wylie Miller (m. 1950)
- Military career
- Branch: Royal Canadian Air Force
- Service years: 1942–45
- Rank: Corporal
- Conflicts: World War II

Walter Frederick Light OC OOnt (24 June 1923 – 24 February 1996) was a Canadian business executive.

Born in Cobalt, Ontario, Light served in the Royal Canadian Air Force during World War II. After the war, he received a degree in electrical engineering from Queen's University in 1949. He started working for Bell Canada eventually being promoted to the head of the engineering department.

In 1974, he became president of Northern Telecom. In 1979, he became president and chief executive officer. He retired in 1984.

== Honours ==
In 1980, he received an honorary doctorate from Concordia University. In 1986, he was made an Officer of the Order of Canada in recognition for bringing Northern Telecom "to the forefront of international technology as a major Canadian multinational". In 1988, he was made a Member of the Order of Ontario. Queen's University's Walter Light Hall is named in his honour.
