= Stalking horse offer =

Initial bid for a bankrupt company

A stalking horse offer, agreement, or bid is a bid for a bankrupt firm or its assets that is arranged in advance of an auction to act, in effect, as a reserve bid. The intent is to maximize the value of its assets or avoid low bids, as part of (or before) a court auction.

To secure a stalking horse offer, the debtor can offer bidding protections such as breakup fees to its best bidder before the auction. These incentives enhance the value of the offering for the bidder, which might lead to a better price offer before the auction begins. This higher offer is now the starting offer for the auction and may result in benefiting the debtor and its estate.

== Examples ==
On October 22, 2007, American technology company SCO asked a bankruptcy court to approve a deal whereby a purchaser would acquire "substantially all assets used by the Company in connection with its SCO UNIX Business and certain related claims in litigation." The agreement included a "stalking horse" provision: If the purchaser, York Capital Management, were to be designated as a stalking horse in subsequent bidding for SCO's assets, and if others outbid York, then SCO would have to pay York a $780,000 breakup fee and reimbursement of all expenses incurred by York up to $300,000. In this way, York would earn its expenses and $780,000 by acting as the stalking horse and preventing other bidders from making lowball offers.

On August 4, 2008, Steve and Barry's LLC, a retailer of casual apparel, filed a stalking horse agreement with the U.S. Bankruptcy Court for the Southern District of New York. Their partner in this asset purchase agreement was BH S&B Holding LLC, a subsidiary of Bay Harbor Management.

On July 27, 2009, The Wall Street Journal reported that Telefon AB L.M. Ericsson had won a stalking horse bid to acquire Nortel Networks Corp's CDMA division, for $1.13 billion.

On July 8, 2010, the Texas Rangers Major League Baseball team announced a potential stalking horse deal. "'An auction with a stalking horse, or minimum, bid is more frequently used than a so-called “naked” auction without a floor price,' William K. Snyder, the court-appointed restructuring officer, said. 'Moreover, the stalking horse bidder commonly receives a “reasonable” break-up fee if unsuccessful in the auction,' said Snyder. Under the scrapped plan, the $304 million in cash portion of the Greenberg-Ryan group’s May 24 deal with owner Tom Hicks would serve as a minimum bid, with the next bid at least $20 million higher. Greenberg-Ryan would have received $15 million if it lost."

On February 21, 2011, Reuters reported Blockbuster's intention to pursue a $290 million stalking horse offer with Cobalt Video Holdco.

On April 4, 2011, TechCrunch reported Google's intention to pursue a $900 million stalking horse bid for Nortel's patents.

In 2013, Hostess Brands used a stalking horse auction to sell off its assets in bankruptcy.

On October 17, 2013, Designline, now known as Environmental Performance Vehicles, a Charlotte, NC bus manufacturer, used the technique but received no offers.

On April 15, 2013, Eastman Kodak proposed a stalking horse deal of $210 million whereby Brother Industries would acquire Kodak's Document Imaging division ahead of Kodak's bankruptcy court approval slated for June 2013.

On June 10, 2016, Ziff Davis proposed a stalking-horse bid of under US$90 million after Gawker Media announced it was filing for Chapter 11 bankruptcy protection.

On March 7, 2017, Extreme Networks entered into a stalking horse arrangement for a portion of assets held by Avaya, which was in Chapter 11 bankruptcy protection at the time. Avaya eventually emerged from bankruptcy protection, making this a rare occasion when a stalking horse auction was not held for assets of a defunct company. The deal was closed on July 17, 2017.

In 2019, Houlihan's Restaurant, Inc. announced a chapter 11 bankruptcy that involves a stalking horse bid by Landry's, Inc.

On July 1, 2024, Delta Apparel filed for chapter 11 bankruptcy with a deal in hand to sell its Salt Life brand. The Duluth, Ga., company said it plans to sell certain assets related to its Salt Life branded products for about $28 million to FCM Saltwater Holdings, which has agreed to act as the stalking horse, or lead, bidder in a court-supervised auction for the assets.

On October 12, 2026, Character.ai announced it was filing for Chapter 11 bankruptcy, with a stalking horse sale to sell "certain of the company's assets" to Disney.
