= Owen Bradford Butler =

American businessman (1924–1998)

- Born: November 11, 1923; Lynchburg, Virginia
- Died: April 21, 1998 (aged 74); Denver, Colorado
- Education: Dartmouth College (AB '47)
- Spouse: Erna Bernie Dalton (m. 1945)
- Military career
- Branch: United States Navy Reserve
- Service years: 1941–45, 1950–51
- Conflicts: World War II; Korean War

Owen Bradford Butler (November 11, 1924 – April 21, 1998) was an American businessman.

== Early life and family ==
Butler was born in Lynchburg, Virginia. He was married to Erna Butler, and they had two children.

== Career ==
Butler joined Procter & Gamble in 1945. After a few years, he became the head of soap department of the company. In 1967, he became head of the food division and a year later, in 1968, he became a vice president.

In 1972, Butler became a member of the board of directors.

In 1981, Butler became the chairman of Procter & Gamble and served until 1986. A year later, he joined the National Committee for Economic Development as its chairman.
