= Vernon Oswald Marquez =

Canadian businessman (1908–2000)

- Born: 15 September 1908; Trinidad, British West Indies
- Died: 14 October 2000 (aged 92); Fort Erie, Ontario
- Education: Saint Mary's College
- Spouse(s): Marjorie Brock Dufeu (m. 1933) Margaret Amy (m. 1944)

Vernon Oswald Marquez (15 September 1908 – 14 October 2000) was president of the Northern Electric Company (now Nortel) from 1967 - 1971.

Business positions
Preceded by Ralph Holley Keefler	President of the Northern Electric Company; 1967–1971	Succeeded by John C. Lobb
