= Mike Zafirovski =

American businessman (born 1953)

Mike S. Zafirovski
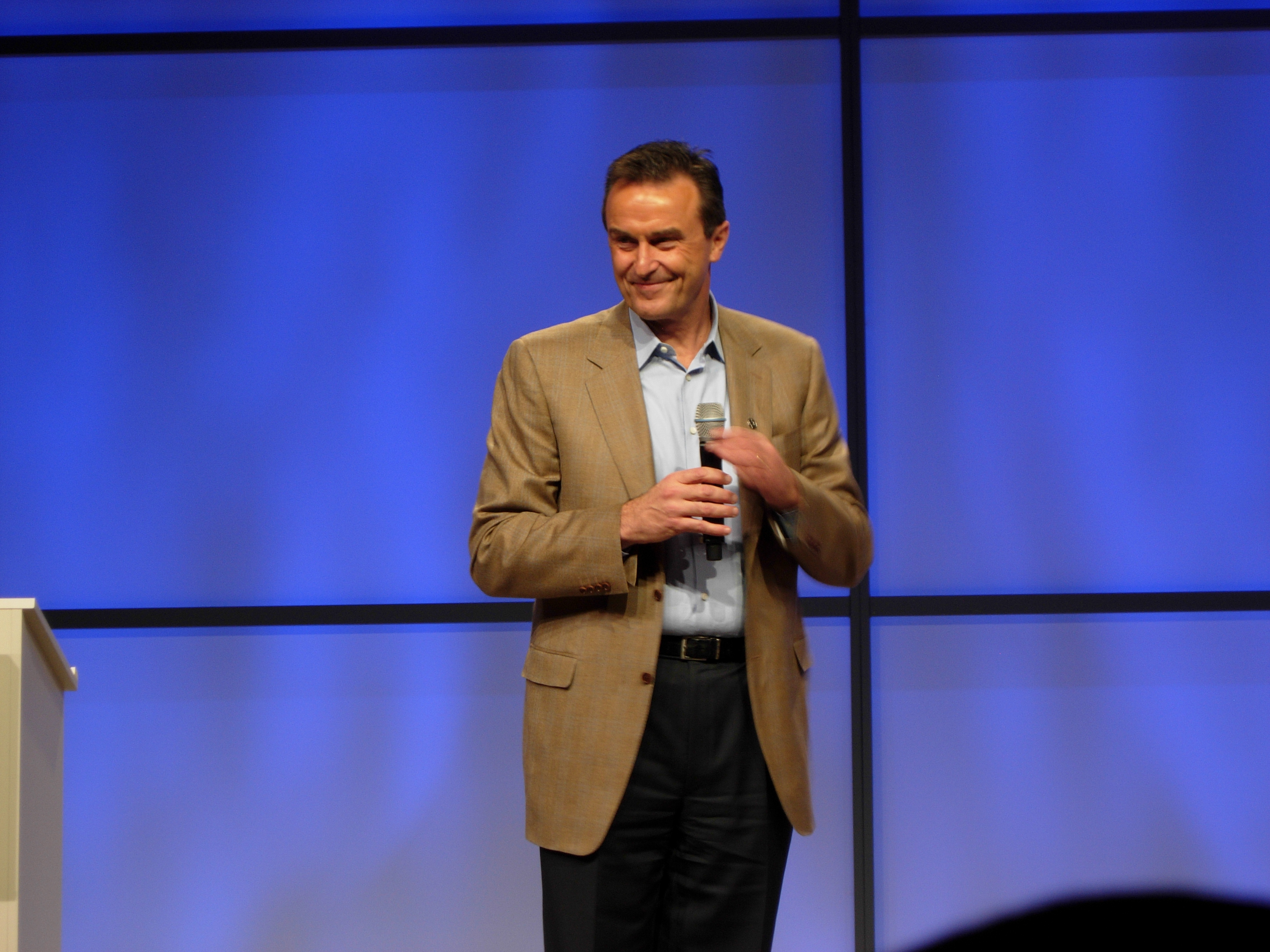
- Zafirovski at a conference in Las Vegas
- Born: November 14, 1953 (age 72); Skopje, Socialist Federal Republic of Yugoslavia
- Education: Bachelor of Arts in Mathematics from Edinboro University; Honorary Doctorate in Public Service from Edinboro University

Michael Svetozar Zafirovski (born November 14, 1953) is a Macedonian American business executive.

== Personal life ==
Zafirovski was born in Skopje in the Socialist Federal Republic of Yugoslavia (the present-day capital of North Macedonia). He immigrated to United States in 1969, arriving in Cleveland, Ohio with his family, $1500 among them and speaking no English. Two years later, he entered Edinboro University on a swimming scholarship. In 2004, he received the Ellis Island Medal of Honor.

== Career ==
Zafirovski spent 24 years with General Electric, starting in 1975, where he went through GE's Jack Welch-style leadership training programs and served in various management positions. Between 1996 and 1999, he was head of the European division of GE Lighting, during which time the division posted record profits. He was then promoted to his last position at GE, as president and CEO of GE Lighting from July 1999 to May 2000.

Afterwards, he joined Motorola, serving as Executive Vice President and President of the Personal Communications Sector from June 2000 until July 2002. In 2002, he was passed over for the promotion to Chief Operating Officer for Edward Breen, but Breen quit later that year and Zafirovski was given the title in July 2002. His success in the PCS division among other achievements at Motorola, seemed to make him a perfect candidate for the CEO position but the title went to Edward Zander on January 5, 2004. Zafirovski resigned on January 12, 2005. He was a consultant to and a director of Motorola from then until May 2005.

When Zafirovski was chosen to head up Nortel Networks in early October, Motorola filed a suit against him, alleging that his new position would break the terms of the non-disclosure agreement he had signed. As part of that agreement, he had received a payoff from Motorola. The payoff had a clawback element should Zafirovski return to work within a defined period he would agree to refund a percentage of the payoff. The problem was he did not want to refund any of the money. As a consequence Nortel agreed to pay $11.5 million on his behalf. Zafirovski became the President and Chief Executive Officer of Nortel Networks, replacing Bill Owens as of November 15, 2005.

Zafirovski announced he was stepping down as CEO of Nortel on August 10, 2009, following the sale of the company's CDMA and LTE businesses to Ericsson as part of a bankruptcy restructuring process. During Zafirovski's entire career at Nortel his email and company profile were compromised by hackers, most likely working for the Chinese Government.

He was elected to the Board of Directors at Boeing on October 25, 2004.

In July 2007 President George W. Bush appointed Zafirovski to the National Security Telecommunications Advisory Committee.

In August 2009, Mike Zafirovski sought a $12 million payout from Nortel. At the same time, employees who had worked for years with the company lost their jobs with no compensation at all.

== See also ==
- Nortel
- Motorola

Business positions
Preceded by Edward Breen	COO of Motorola; 2002–2005	Succeeded by -
Preceded by Bill Owens	CEO of Nortel Networks; 2005–2009	Succeeded by -
