= Guylaine Saucier =

Guylaine Saucier CM, (born 10 June 1946), a Canadian, is the CEO of Gérard Saucier Ltée, a major group specialing in forestry products. She was the chairperson of the Canadian Broadcasting Corporation (CBC). She is a member of the board of directors at Bank of Montreal and the Institute for Governance of Private and Public Organizations

== Biography ==
Born in Noranda, Quebec, Saucier is a corporate director of the Bank of Montreal, Petro-Canada, AXA Assurances Areva, Groupe Danone, and Wendel. She is a former chairman of the board of directors of the Canadian Broadcasting Corporation, a former director of the Bank of Canada, Altran Technologies SA from 2003 to 2007, CHC Helicopter Corporation from 2005 to 2008, Nortel Networks Corporation from 1997 to 2005 and Tembec Inc. from 1991 - 2005. She also served as a former chair of the Canadian Institute of Chartered Accountants (CICA), a former director of the International Federation of Accountants, and was the first woman to serve as President of the Quebec Chamber of Commerce. She serves as a director of the Fondation du Musée des Beaux Arts. In 2001 she headed a Joint committee on corporate governance which reported to the Toronto Stock Exchange.

Saucier obtained a B.A. from Collège Marguerite-Bourgeois and a B.Comm. from the École des Hautes Études Commerciales, Université de Montréal. She is a Fellow of the Canadian Institute of Chartered Accountants and a Member of the Order of Canada. In 2004, she received the Fellowship Award from the Institute of Corporate Directors, in 2007, she obtained the Institute Certified Designation from the Institute of Corporate Directors, and in 2010, Administrateur de Société Emérite from Collège des Administrateurs de sociétés.
