= William Owens (admiral) =

United States Navy admiral

William A. Owens
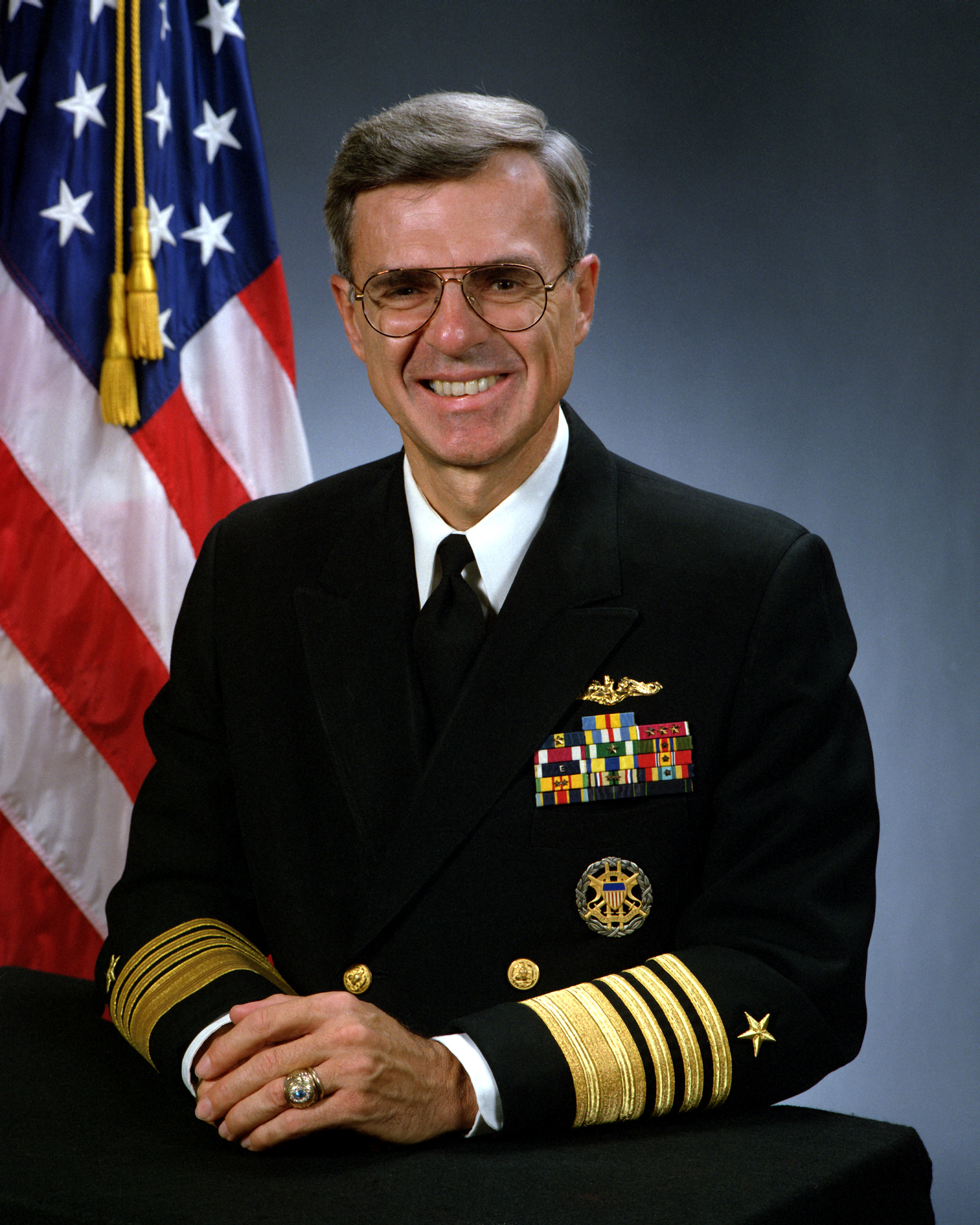
- Official portrait, 1994
- Born: May 8, 1940 (age 86); Bismarck, North Dakota, US
- Military career
- Allegiance: United States
- Branch: United States Navy
- Service years: 1962–1996
- Rank: Admiral
- Nickname: Bill
- Commands: Vice Chairman of the Joint Chiefs of Staff; United States Sixth Fleet; USS City of Corpus Christi; USS Sam Houston
- Conflicts: Vietnam War; Gulf War
- Awards: Defense Distinguished Service Medal; Navy Distinguished Service Medal (2); Defense Superior Service Medal; Legion of Merit (4)
- Other work: CEO, Nortel; CEO, Science Applications International Corporation; co-CEO, Teledesic LLC; author

William Arthur Owens (born May 8, 1940) is a retired admiral of the United States Navy and who served as the third vice chairman of the Joint Chiefs of Staff from 1994 to 1996. Since leaving the military in 1996, he served as an executive or as a member of the board of directors of various companies, including Nortel Networks Corporation.

== Early life ==
Owens was born and raised in Bismarck, North Dakota. He graduated from Bismarck High School in 1958 and from the United States Naval Academy in 1962 with a bachelor's degree in mathematics. On a Rhodes Scholarship, he earned bachelor's and master's degrees in politics, philosophy, and economics from the University of Oxford, graduating with honors. He later earned a master's degree in management from George Washington University, again graduating with honors.

== Naval career ==
Owens began his career as a nuclear submariner. He served on four strategic nuclear-powered submarines and three nuclear attack submarines, including tours as commanding officer aboard the USS Sam Houston and USS City of Corpus Christi. Owens spent a total of 4,000 days (more than 10 years) aboard submarines, including duty in Vietnam.

Owens was a senior military assistant to Secretaries of Defense Frank Carlucci and Dick Cheney, and director of the Office of Program Appraisal for the Secretary of the Navy. He also served as the deputy chief of naval operations for resources, warfare requirements and assessments, from 1991 to 1993.

Owens served as commander of the United States Sixth Fleet from 1990 to 1992, which included during Operation Desert Storm. He was appointed to Vice Chairman of the Joint Chiefs of Staff, the second-ranking military office in the United States, by Bill Clinton in March 1994. He retired in 1996.

In April 2000, Owens co-authored Lifting the Fog of War with Edward Offley.

=== Promotions ===
Ensign	Lieutenant (junior grade)	Lieutenant	Lieutenant Commander	Commander	Captain
O-1	O-2	O-3	O-4	O-5	O-6
June 6, 1962	December 6, 1963	December 1, 1965	September 1, 1969	July 1, 1977	August 1, 1983

Rear Admiral (lower half)	Rear Admiral (upper half)	Vice Admiral	Admiral
O-7	O-8	O-9	O-10
November 1, 1988	August 13, 1990	February 1, 1991	December 2, 1993

=== Awards and decorations ===
Submarine Warfare insignia
Office of the Joint Chiefs of Staff Identification Badge

Defense Distinguished Service Medal
Navy Distinguished Service Medal with award star
Defense Superior Service Medal
Legion of Merit with three award stars
Meritorious Service Medal
Navy Commendation Medal with award star
Navy Meritorious Unit Commendation with service star
Navy "E" Ribbon
Navy Expeditionary Medal
National Defense Service Medal with service star
Vietnam Service Medal with two service stars
Southwest Asia Service Medal with two service stars
Sea Service Deployment Ribbon with service star
Overseas Service Ribbon
Rifle Marksmanship Ribbon
Pistol Marksmanship Ribbon

== Business career ==
After leaving the navy, Owens served as president, chief operating officer and vice chairman of Science Applications International Corporation ("SAIC").

In August 1999, Owens served as vice chairman and co-chief executive officer of Teledesic LLC, a satellite communications company. In June 2003, he became the chairman and chief executive officer.

On April 28, 2004, Owens became the chief executive officer of Nortel, where he had previously served on the board of directors since February 2002. Owens stepped in to replace Frank Dunn, who was fired following an investigation into financial reporting. Owens served until November 15, 2005, when he was succeeded by Mike Zafirovski.

On April 1, 2006, Owens became the chairman and CEO of AEA Holdings Asia overseeing all Private Equity, and Real Estate investments in Asia. Admiral Owens is also a chairman of privately held Intelius, an information commerce company based in Bellevue, Washington. Owens serves as a member of the board of directors of Polycom Inc., Daimler Chrysler AG, Embarq, Intelius, and Force 10. Since July 1, 2006, Owens has also served as an independent director of Indian global information technology services company Wipro.

In July 2009, Owens assumed the post of non-executive chairman of US telecommunications company, CenturyLink. In August 2009, one month after his appointment at CenturyLink, Owens founded Amerilink Telecom Corp., a US telecommunications consultancy which partnered with China's Huawei Technologies in an effort to win a major contract with Sprint for its multibillion-dollar network upgrade project. Amerilink's role in this effort appears to have been to provide independent verification by trusted Americans that Huawei Technologies would not represent a security threat to the U.S. as well as to monitor Huawei Technologies activities on an ongoing basis were it to win the contract. In addition to Admiral Owens, the Amerilink Board included Gordon England, who served as deputy secretary of defense and homeland security under former president George W. Bush, former Majority Leader in the US House of Representatives, Richard Gephardt, and former World Bank President James Wolfensohn. Huawei Technologies provided considerable guarantees concerning security concerns, included offering to convey its code to security officials. But security concerns prevailed and may help explain Sprint's decision not to work with Huawei.

== Post career activities ==
In July 2022, he joined with other former U.S. military leaders in condemning former president and commander in chief, Donald Trump. "While rioters tried to thwart the peaceful transfer of power and ransacked the Capitol on Jan. 6, 2021, the president and commander in chief, Donald Trump, abdicated his duty to preserve, protect and defend the Constitution.

In October 2022, Owens joined the Council for Responsible Social Media project launched by Issue One to address the negative mental, civic, and public health impacts of social media in the United States co-chaired by former House Democratic Caucus Leader Dick Gephardt and former Massachusetts Lieutenant Governor Kerry Healey.

Military offices
Preceded by David E. Jeremiah	Vice Chairman of the Joint Chiefs of Staff; 1994–1996	Succeeded by Joseph Ralston
Business positions
Preceded by Frank Dunn	CEO of Nortel Networks; 2004–2005	Succeeded by Mike Zafirovski
