= Portable Commutator =

Northern Electric Portable Commutator

The Portable Commutator was a telecommunications device that was used by the military during World War I. It was manufactured by Northern Electric Company. It was used as a one-wire telegraphic switchboard.
