= Jean Monty =

- Born: 26 June 1947 (age 79); Montreal, Quebec
- Education: Collège Sainte-Marie (BA '67); University of Western Ontario (MA '69); University of Chicago (MBA '70)
- Spouse: Jocelyne Bélanger (m. 1969)

Jean Claude Monty CC (born 26 June 1947) is a Canadian business executive. He was the CEO of Nortel Networks from 1993 to 1997, and the chairman and CEO of BCE from 1997 to 2002. He is credited with having successfully led BCE from a traditional phone company into a multifaceted internet and media provider in the early 2000s.

== Early life and education ==
Monty was born and raised in Montreal in 1947.

He studied at College Sainte-Marie of Montreal and graduated with a Bachelor of Arts, completed a Master of Arts in economics from the University of Western Ontario and completed a Master of Business Administration from the Chicago Booth School of Business.

== Career ==
Monty began his career at Bell Canada in 1974 and held multiple positions in the company. In 1993, he became president and CEO of Nortel Networks. He retired from BCE in 2002, after having been chairman and CEO.

Monty has been on various corporate boards including Bombardier, Alcatel Lucent and Fiera Capital.

== Personal life ==
In 1994, Monty was awarded the Order of Canada for his leadership in the telecommunications industry and involvement in the community.

Monty is married to Jocelyne Monty.
