= John Roth (businessman) =

Canadian businessman (born 1942)

- Born: 6 October 1942 (age 84); Calgary, Alberta
- Education: McGill University (BE '64, MEng '66)
- Spouse: Margaret Anne (m. 1968)

John Andrew Roth (born 6 October 1942) is a Canadian retired business executive. He was the chief executive officer and chairman of Nortel Networks between 1997 and 2001. While he was called "the most successful businessman in modern Canadian history" by Time magazine and named Canada's CEO of the Year by a Bay Street panel in the fall of 2000, by the ignominious end of his career it became clear that his mismanagement destroyed the company.

== Career at Nortel ==
Roth joined Northern Telecom in 1969 as a design engineer, rising to become CEO after a long career. Nortel, once one of the most highly regarded Canadian companies in history, fell into severe financial difficulties under his tenure and filed for bankruptcy shortly after Mr. Roth was forced out. Although he had in the past received much praise from a credulous business press, it became clear that his mismanagement led to the destruction of a once great company. The Toronto Star, reporting on January 14, 2013 on the trial of Mr. Roth's successor as CEO reported "... the real force behind Nortel’s demise — [was]the reckless conduct of ... former Nortel CEO John Roth...Roth emerged from the wreckage with more than $100 million in stock-option proceeds."

Nortel eventually filed for bankruptcy protection in Canada and the United States. The bankruptcy case was the largest in Canadian history and left pensioners, shareholders and former employees with enormous losses. Total losses to those stakeholders amounted to $54 billion, the tenth largest such loss in the history of capitalism.

Between 1993 and 1995, Roth served as president of Nortel's North American operations. He was named Northern Telecom Limited's CEO in 1995 and was elected to the board of directors in 1996. In February 1997, he was named president of the corporation, in addition to continuing to serve as CEO. In October 1997, Roth became president and CEO of the company which became known as Nortel Networks.

Under Roth's control, Nortel became the leading engine of Canada's 1990s high-tech boom. Nortel became the most important company traded on the Toronto Stock Exchange and became one of Canada's leading employers. Roth used his success and high popularity to lobby the government for tax cuts, but he did not support Clive Allen's statement to threaten to move Nortel to the United States if taxes were not lowered.

Network World, on January 4, 1999, referred to Roth as one of the 25 most powerful people in networking, a "man of boldness and vision, one who would rather strike than be stricken."

Forbes magazine, on December 13, 2000, referred to Roth as having "engineered some 16 acquisitions while putting the pedal to the metal internally to transform Nortel from a simple telecom equipment provider into a global brand name identified with the Internet."

"We were a slow company and we had to work very hard to become a fast one," says Roth, who began his tenure as CEO with a letter to employees in which he told them the time had come for the century-old company to "get off its duff" and join the new economy.

Time Europe, on December 25, 2000, noted that "The change [in Canadian government policies] marked the triumph of ideas forcefully argued by the most successful businessman in modern Canadian history: Nortel Networks CEO John Roth, 58. Mr. Roth warned that 'the country (Canada) risked becoming a second-rank economic power unless it changed its wealth-crimping tax policies and supported high-tech winners (like Nortel)". Roth urged the government of Canada to provide "better tax treatment of stock options", saying, "Policies and business strategies that worked well in the industrial era are a recipe for stagnation and decline in the new economy." Roth invested heavily in fiber-optic communication technology which was seen as the key infrastructure technology for the new network.

== Retirement ==
In November 2001, Roth was replaced as CEO of Nortel Networks by Frank Dunn.

== See also ==
- Edward Fleetford Sise First President Northern Electric Company

Business positions
Preceded by Jean Monty	CEO of Northern Telecom Limited; 1995—1997	Succeeded by Position abolished Merged with Bay Networks to form Nortel Networks
Business positions
Preceded by (none)	CEO of Nortel Networks; 1997—2001	Succeeded by Frank Dunn
