= John Cleghorn =

Canadian business executive (born 1941)

- Born: 7 July 1941 (age 85); Montreal, Quebec
- Education: McGill University (BCom 1962)
- Spouse: Pattie Eleanor Hart (m. 1963)

John Edward Cleghorn OC (born 7 July 1941) is a Canadian business executive and a former university leader. Cleghorn served as chairman and chief executive officer of Royal Bank of Canada from 1994 until 2001. He is also a former chairman of the board of Canadian Pacific Railway.

== Biography ==
Born in Montreal, Quebec, he graduated from Westmount High School and received a B.Com. from the McGill University Desautels Faculty of Management in 1962. While at McGill, he was a defensive lineman for the McGill Redmen football team that won the national championship. He was also a brother in Psi Upsilon. In 1964, he became a Chartered Accountant whilst working for Clarkson Gordon and subsequently a Fellow of the Institute of Chartered Accountants of Ontario and Quebec.

He joined Royal Bank in 1974, becoming president in 1986, chief operating officer in 1990, chief executive officer in 1994, and chairman in 1995. A champion of corporate restraint, he sold off the corporate jet, closed the executive dining rooms, and ended the use of the executive limousines. He frequently rode the subway or flew economy class in order to interact with customers. He also took part in talks with Matthew Barrett, chairman and CEO of the Bank of Montreal, to merge their respective institutions, however Finance Minister Paul Martin later blocked the proposed arrangement. Cleghorn retired as chairman and CEO in 2001, and was succeeded as CEO by Gordon Nixon and as board chairman by Guy St. Pierre.

He has been a chairman of the board of SNC-Lavalin and was a director of Finning International and Nortel Networks. He played an influential role in the Nortel board meeting that forced CEO Frank Dunn and two other senior executives to resign in April 2004 after financial results were misrepresented.

From 1996 to 2003, he was chancellor of Wilfrid Laurier University. He has also been a member of McGill University's board of governors for many years. He holds honorary degrees from Acadia, Bishop's, McGill and Wilfrid Laurier universities.

In 2001, he was made an Officer of the Order of Canada, and was inducted into the Canadian Business Hall of Fame in 2008.

John is married to Pattie Cleghorn. They have three children; Charlie, Ian and Andrea. Charlie has one child; Henry Cleghorn (22). Ian has two; Erica (20) and Jamie Cleghorn (18). Andrea has three; Keighley (18), Brenna (17) and Fraser Moore (15).

== Notes ==
Academic offices
Preceded by Willard Z. Estey	Chancellor of Wilfrid Laurier University; 1996–2003	Succeeded by Bob Rae
Business positions
Preceded by Allan R. Taylor	CEO and Chairperson of Royal Bank of Canada; 1994–2001	Succeeded by Gordon Nixon
