= Lynton Wilson =

Canadian businessman (1940–2026)

- Born: 3 April 1940; Port Colborne, Ontario, Canada
- Died: 9 February 2026 (aged 85)
- Education: McMaster University (BA '62); Cornell University (MA '67)
- Spouse: Brenda Jean Black (m. 1968)

Lynton Ronald "Red" Wilson OC (3 April 1940 – 9 February 2026) was a Canadian business executive. He served as chairman of the board at both Nortel and CAE, chief executive officer at BCE, and corporate director of DaimlerChrysler.

== Life and career ==
Wilson was born and raised in Port Colborne, Ontario, and educated at Port Colborne High School. He obtained an undergraduate degree from McMaster University before entering the foreign service. After postings in Vienna and Japan, Wilson became a teaching assistant at Cornell University where he earned an M.A. in Economics.

Entering the corporate world, Wilson held the position of corporate economist and director of economic research with John Labatt Ltd. from 1969 to 1971, before becoming co-ordinator-industrial research and development policy for the Federal Government.

Wilson left the government again in 1974 to take up a vice-presidency and directorship with MacMillan Bloedel, but returned to the civil service to become the executive director (1977–78) and then deputy minister (1978–1981) of industry and tourism for the Government of Ontario.

Returning once more to the corporate world in 1981, Wilson became the president and CEO of Redpath Industries Ltd., later becoming chairman in 1988. In 1989, he was appointed vice-chairman of the Bank of Nova Scotia. Wilson became president and COO of BCE Inc., Canada's largest telecommunications company, in 1990, was appointed president and CEO in 1992, and added the responsibilities of chairman in 1993. Wilson stepped down from all but his position as chairman in 1998, but continued to serve as chairman of the board until 2000. Between 2000 and 2005 he served as chairman for Nortel.

Wilson held numerous honorary degrees, and was appointed officer of the Order of Canada in 1997. In later life he continued to be involved with companies such as Nortel Networks, CAE Inc., and Daimler AG, and also served as chancellor of his alma mater, McMaster University from 2007 to 2013.

Wilson died on 9 February 2026, at the age of 85. He was survived by his wife, Brenda, and their three children and grandchildren.

Academic offices
Preceded by Melvin M. Hawkrigg	Chancellor of McMaster University; 2007–2013	Succeeded by Suzanne Labarge
