= CHYC (AM) =

Former radio station in Montreal, Quebec

CHYC-AM
Defunct
- Montreal, Quebec; Canada

Ownership
- Owner: Northern Electric

History
- First air date: 1922
- Last air date: 1932
- Call sign meaning: CHYC

CHYC-AM was a Canadian radio station, which broadcast in Montreal, Quebec. It was owned and operated by Northern Electric Co. and was officially closed in 1932.

The call letters "CHYC" were assigned to Northern Electric in 1922.

== Sister stations ==
Other stations during the 1920s through the 1930s.

- CFCF
- CKAC

== Notes ==
- Listening in: the first decade of Canadian broadcasting, 1922-1932 By Mary Vipond

Edition: illustrated Published by McGill-Queen's Press - MQUP, 1992 ISBN 0-7735-0917-8, ISBN 978-0-7735-0917-7

- The Invisible Empire: A History of the Telecommunications Industry in Canada By Jean-Guy Rens, Käthe Roth Translated by Käthe Roth Edition: illustrated, revised

Published by McGill-Queen's Press - MQUP, 2001 ISBN 0-7735-2052-X, 9780773520523
