= Nortel Retirees and former employees Protection Canada =

NRPC is a non-profit member-supported organization for Canadian former employees of Nortel. It was formed after announcements in the media that Nortel Networks, a large multinational telecommunications company, had entered bankruptcy proceedings in several countries.

== Constituency ==
Most of the members of NRPC are entitled to a defined benefit pension; however, it is not clear how many are entitled, now and in the future, to medical benefits and other benefits from Nortel.

In his statement to the Finance Standing Committee on March 25, 2010, Don Sproule, president of the NRPC, stated that 11,000 pensioners or surviving spouses are entitled, and 700 pensioners or surviving spouses are not entitled to medical benefits. The implication is that roughly 8,000 former employees are not now, nor will they in the future be, entitled to medical benefits.

However, according to Barry E.Wadsworth, Associate Counsel Canadian Auto Workers representing unionized Nortel former employees, all individuals currently receiving a pension are in receipt of medical benefits.

According to an Oct 13, 2016 Reuters article there were 22 thousand participants in Nortel’s underfunded pension plan in 2009.

== History ==
On January 14, 2009, Nortel Networks initiated financial restructuring under the Companies' Creditors Arrangement Act (CCAA) in Canada. At that time, Nortel Networks stopped paying severance packages, transition allowances, and deferred wages to former employees and retirees.

NRPC was started by volunteer Nortel pensioners from Ottawa in an effort to obtain court approval to have this non-profit organization sponsored by Nortel Networks. The organizers quickly formed an ad hoc committee and organized several mass meetings in several Canadian cities. The meetings were announced at NPYG (Nortel_Pension Yahoo Group) a self-help group formed in 2002 for employees, ex-employees, retirees and family members of Nortel Networks. Word quickly spread and the local Ottawa media started paying attention.

NRPC announced their first (Montreal-only) website on January 23, 2009. On February 14, 2009, the Ottawa branch of the NPRC opened its website. On May 16, 2009, the Montreal website of NRPC started directing traffic to the newly formed NRPC website.

=== 2009 representation order and incorporation ===
In an order issued by the Ontario Superior Court of Justice on May 27, 2009, Donald Sproule, David Archibald and Michael Campbell were appointed representatives of, and the law firm Koskie Minsky was appointed as legal counsel for, all former Nortel employees, with the exception of some unionized employees.

In September 2009, the NRPC incorporated as a not-for-profit organization.

=== Agreements between Nortel and the NRPC ===
==== February 8, 2010, agreement reached with Nortel on behalf of all former employees ====
On February 8, 2010, NRPC announced it reached an agreement (awaiting court approval) with Nortel in which Nortel would advance $57 million to fund medical and life insurance benefits for some Canadian pensioners and their survivors, and provide long-term disabled employees with wage-replacement, medical and life insurance benefits until December 31, 2010. It is unknown how many ex-employees will benefit from this agreement.

In return, NRPC agreed:

- to not oppose any Nortel employee incentive program.
- that the claims of continuing and former Canadian employees of Nortel will be treated as unsecured claims, unless there is a change to the Bankruptcy and Insolvency Act.
- that Nortel will stop topping-up its underfunded pension plan after the last payment made in March 2010.
- that Nortel will be released from liability regarding the pension plan or the Health and Welfare Trust except for claims based on fraud, gross negligence, contractual rights, or misrepresentation by the directors or wrongful or oppressive

==== Opposition to February 8, 2010, agreement ====
A group of Nortel former employees have retained the services of Rochon Genova LLP to voice their opposition to the February 8, 2010, agreement in court. Other creditors also opposed the agreement.

The Ottawa Citizen reported on March 4, 2010, that the dissident Nortel employees objecting to a deal with Nortel lost their first battle in Ontario court. However, the Montreal Gazette reported on March 5, 2010, that the judge may veto this agreement. The Ottawa Citizen reported on March 6, 2010, that Ontario Superior Court Justice Morawetz would issue a ruling within week.

==== Rejection of Nortel pensioner deal by the court ====
On March 26, 2010, Ontario Superior Court Justice J. Morawetz rejected the February 8, 2010 agreement. Siding with the noteholders and the official committee of unsecured creditors, Justice Morawetz concluded that the agreement was unfair to non-employee creditors. He said the agreement was flawed because it created risk instead of eliminating uncertainty, referring to a clause in the agreement that allows Nortel pensioners, long-term disability recipients and others to demand a bigger share of Nortel assets if federal bankruptcy rules change in future. The condition is unfair to other creditors because it requires them to make concessions in favour of the former employees and long-term disability employees today, and be subject to the uncertainty of unknown legislation in the future.

=== Reduction of benefits in 2011 ===
A letter sent to Canadian pensioners in July 2011 from the Nortel pension administrator Morneau Shepell announced that pensioners in Canada would have their benefits cut. A webinar held by the legal firm Koskie Minsky on July 22, 2010, addressed some of the questions raised.

The windup of the $5 billion Nortel pension plan began in October 2010. Between that time and July 2011, Nortel pensioners had been receiving their full pensions even though actuaries have determined that the pension trust is underfunded by $1.5 billion. The reduced payments are to retroactively reflect those overpayments.

According to the Toronto Star, about 12,000 current Nortel pensioners face benefit cuts of as much as 43 per cent, depending on their province of residence and where they worked for Nortel, which filed for protection from creditors in January 2009.

In Ontario:

- unionized members will get 75 per cent of their non-indexed pensions
- non-managerial staff will get 70 per cent.

Outside Ontario:

- union members will get 59 per cent of their indexed pensions
- non-union pensioners will get 57 per cent.

== See also ==
- Nortel
- Financial Services Commission of Ontario
- Employee Retirement Income Security Act
