= David G. Friehling =

American person convicted of tax crimes

- Born: November 27, 1959 (age 66); Sullivan County, New York
- Education: Cornell University
- Occupation: Accountant
- Conviction: November 3, 2009 (pleaded guilty)
- Criminal charges: securities fraud, aiding and abetting investment adviser fraud, filing false audit reports with the Securities and Exchange Commission
- Penalty: One year home detention, one year supervised release, forfeiture of $3.18 million

David G. Friehling (born November 27, 1959) is an American accountant who was arrested and charged in March 2009 for his role in the Madoff investment scandal. He subsequently pleaded guilty to rubber-stamping Bernard Madoff's filings with regulators rather than fully reviewing them. His role in covering up Madoff's massive Ponzi scheme makes it the largest accounting fraud in history.

== Early life ==
Friehling was born in Sullivan County, north of New York City, and attended high school in Liberty, New York. His family owned the Stevensville Hotel, a Borscht Belt resort in Swan Lake, New York. He is a 1981 graduate of Cornell University, and a past-president of the Rockland chapter of the NYS Society of CPAs (NYSSCPA).

== Friehling & Horowitz as Madoff's auditors ==
From 1991 to 2008, Friehling & Horowitz, a little-known accounting firm in New City, New York, a small hamlet in the Rockland County suburbs north of New York City, signed off on audits on Bernard L. Madoff Investment Securities LLC's books. Friehling falsely represented to investors and the Securities and Exchange Commission that he and the firm had audited the Madoff firm and that it was financially sound. In the meantime, Friehling and his family withdrew millions of dollars from accounts at the Madoff firm, over $5.5 million since 2000. Madoff's fraud was the largest Ponzi scheme in history. Friehling's role in the scam also made it the largest accounting scandal ever uncovered, dwarfing the $11 billion accounting fraud masterminded by Bernard Ebbers at WorldCom.

The firm consisted of two principals—Friehling and Jerome Horowitz—and a part-time secretary. Horowitz met Madoff in 1963 while working at the accounting firm run by Saul Alpern, Madoff's father-in-law. At the time, the Madoff organization was a penny stock trader. He audited Madoff's books for years, and took the Madoff account with him after starting his own firm. He retired to Palm Beach Gardens, Florida, in 1991 and handed the account to his son-in-law, Friehling. Horowitz died on March 12, 2009–the day Madoff entered his guilty plea–after a long battle with cancer; it is not known whether he was a target of the Madoff investigation.

Well before the Madoff scandal broke, several observers doubted that a tiny firm with only one active accountant could competently audit a firm that had grown into a multibillion-dollar operation. In 2007, Aksia, a hedge fund consultant, warned its clients to stay away from Madoff for that very reason; its CEO, Jim Vos, likened this situation to General Motors being audited by a three-person firm. Others were suspicious that Madoff refused requests for due diligence because his accountant—supposedly his brother-in-law—was the only one allowed to see the books. Indeed, for many years, Friehling's practice was so small that he operated out of his house. He only got an office when Madoff told him that some investors were asking questions about the audits. Even then, his operation remained very small; in 2008 it only garnered $180,000 in earnings, far less than conventional wisdom would suggest for a firm that was supposedly earning substantial fees from auditing the Madoff operation.

Soon after the Madoff scandal broke, it emerged that Friehling & Horowitz had informed the American Institute of Certified Public Accountants in writing since 1993 that it didn't conduct audits. An investigation into Friehling by Rockland County district attorney Thomas Zugibe was stopped in deferral to the investigation by the United States Attorney for the Southern District of New York. However, he publicly claimed to have "hundreds of clients."

Friehling was not registered with the Public Company Accounting Oversight Board, which was created under the Sarbanes-Oxley Act of 2002 to help detect fraud. Nor was the firm "peer reviewed", in which auditors check one another for quality control. According to the AICPA, Friehling was enrolled in their peer-review program, but was not required to participate because he supposedly didn't conduct audits. It later emerged that Madoff's banker, JPMorgan Chase, had known that Friehling wasn't registered with the PCAOB or subject to peer review as early as 2006. Additionally, officials at Fairfield Greenwich Group, operator of the largest Madoff feeder fund, had been aware as early as 2005 that Friehling was the firm's sole employee.

== Arrest, guilty plea, cooperation with federal government, and sentence ==
Friehling was charged on March 18, 2009, with securities fraud, aiding and abetting investment adviser fraud, and four counts of filing false audit reports with the Securities and Exchange Commission.

On July 10, 2009, Friehling waived indictment and pleaded not guilty to criminal charges. He agreed to proceed without having the evidence in the criminal case against him reviewed by a grand jury at a hearing before U.S. District Judge Alvin Hellerstein in Manhattan.

On November 3, 2009, he pleaded guilty to the charges against him. He admitted to simply rubber-stamping Madoff's filings with the SEC; rather than perform actual audits, he signed blank SEC forms before Madoff and others filled them in. He also revealed that he continued to audit Madoff even though he had invested a substantial amount of money with him; accountants aren't allowed to audit broker-dealers with whom they're investing. He agreed to forfeit $3.18 million in accounting fees and withdrawals from his account with Madoff, as well as his three-story, 4,400-square-foot house in New City and one other property. Friehling faced a maximum sentence of 114 years in prison, but unlike Madoff agreed to cooperate with the government. The guilty plea effectively ended his career as an accountant; the SEC is not allowed to accept audits from convicted felons. He lost his CPA license on July 19, 2010.

Friehling's sentencing was originally set for February 2010, but was postponed several times at the prosecutors' request due to his cooperation with the government's effort to unwind Madoff's crimes. It was initially rescheduled to September 2010 (at the request of the prosecution, citing Friehling's "continuing cooperation with the Government"). In March 2012 it was postponed to October 26, 2012. In July 2014, it was postponed to December 2014. In late 2014, it was postponed again.

In May 2015, U.S. District Judge Laura Taylor Swain sentenced Friehling to one year of home detention and one year of supervised release. Friehling avoided prison because he cooperated extensively with federal prosecutors and because he had been unaware of the extent of Madoff's crimes. Addressing the court at the hearing, Friehling apologized to Madoff's victims. Referring to Madoff's reported statement that he was a "dumb auditor", Friehling said: "I would rather be regarded as dumb than crooked. I did not question what I should have questioned."

Swain accepted the plea terms, but suggested that Friehling be forced to pay part of the overall $130 million forfeiture arising from the fraud. Swain said that she did not believe Friehling's nonfeasance took place "in a vacuum", and felt the forfeiture was necessary to hold the defendants to account even though it will likely never be repaid in full.

== SEC charges ==
The SEC sued Friehling and his firm on March 18, 2009. On November 3, 2009, Friehling and his firm agreed to a settlement in which they neither admitted nor denied the charges. They also accepted permanent injunctions barring them from violating "certain antifraud provisions" of the securities laws. However, Friehling's guilty plea that same day effectively estopped him from contesting the SEC's allegations, and also had the effect of permanently closing his firm.

Madoff's firm paid Friehling between $12,000 and $14,500 a month for his services between 2004 and 2007.

== Personal life and family ==
Friehling has three children. Trusting in Madoff, he placed his own family's savings, including college savings, into Madoff's business.

In November 2012, Friehling's 23-year-old son Jeremy Friehling, a second-year student at the Ohio State University College of Medicine, committed suicide.

== See also ==
- 2008 financial crisis
- Accounting scandals
- Bernard Madoff
- Certified public accountant
- Corporate abuse
- Dot-com bubble
- Due diligence
- Enron
- FBI
- Forensic Accounting
- Licensure
- Sarbanes-Oxley Act
- United States housing bubble
- White Collar Crime
- Worldcom
