= Lansdale Silk Hosiery Compy-Interstate Hosiery Mills, Inc. =

- U.S. National Register of Historic Places
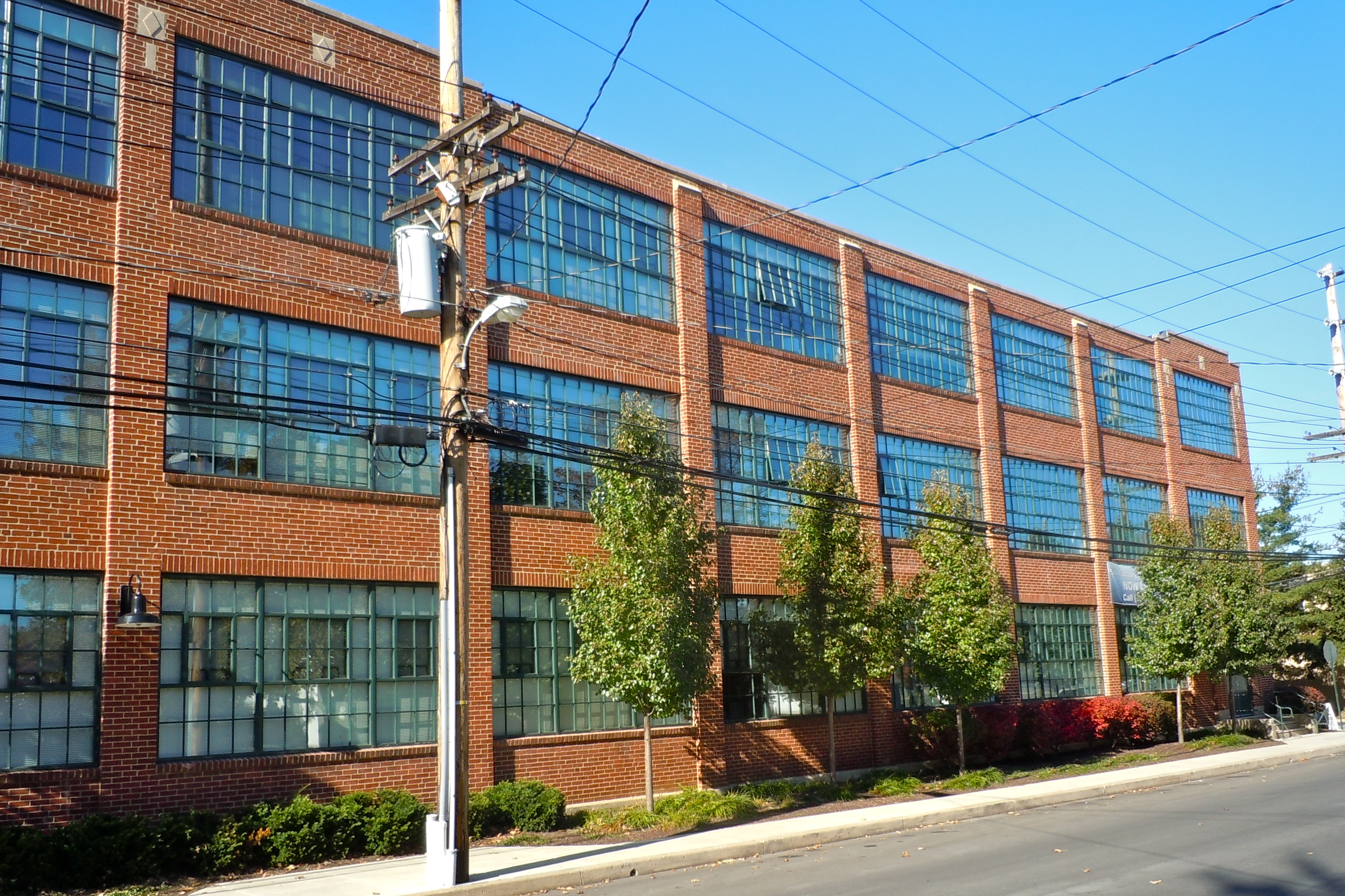
- Lansdale Silk Hosiery Compy-Interstate Hosiery Mills, Inc., November 2011

- Location within Pennsylvania Location within the United States
- Location: 200 S. Line St., Lansdale, Pennsylvania
- Coordinates: 40°14′13″N 75°16′55″W
- Area: 3.1 acres (1.3 ha)
- Built: 1922, 1932
- Architectural style: Early Commercial
- NRHP reference No.: 04001289
- Added to NRHP: December 3, 2004

The Lansdale Silk Hosiery Compy-Interstate Hosiery Mills, Inc. is an historic silk mill complex located in Lansdale, Montgomery County, Pennsylvania, United States.

It was added to the National Register of Historic Places in 2004.

== History and architectural features ==
This complex was built in four interconnected phases between 1922 and 1961, with the original 1922 building (including its additions) and the 1932 building included in the listing. The original building was constructed in 1922, with additions made in 1926, 1928, and 1929. The building is two stories tall and sits on a brownstone foundation. The 1932 building is a three-story, red brick building with a flat roof and brick parapet. The complex produced women's full-fashioned silk hosiery and was occupied by textile manufacturers into the 1970s.
