= Accounting scandal =

Scandal arising from the disclosure of financial misdeeds

An accounting scandal is a business scandal that arises from intentional manipulation of financial statements, with the disclosure of financial misdeeds by trusted executives of corporations or governments. Such misdeeds typically involve complex methods for misusing or misdirecting funds, overstating revenues, understating expenses, overstating the value of corporate assets, or underreporting the existence of liabilities; these can be detected either manually or by means of deep learning. It involves an employee, an accountant, or the corporation itself and is misleading to investors and shareholders.

This type of "creative accounting" can amount to fraud, and investigations are typically launched by government oversight agencies, such as the Securities and Exchange Commission (SEC) in the United States. Employees who commit accounting fraud at the request of their employers are subject to personal criminal prosecution.

== Two types of fraud ==
=== Misappropriation of assets ===
Misappropriation of assets – often called defalcation or employee fraud – occurs when an employee steals a company's assets, whether those assets are of a monetary or physical nature. Typically, assets stolen are cash, or cash equivalents, and company data or intellectual property. However, misappropriation of assets also includes taking inventory out of a facility or using company assets for personal purposes without authorization. Company assets include everything from office supplies and inventory to intellectual property.

=== Fraudulent financial reporting ===
Fraudulent financial reporting is also known as earnings management fraud. In this context, management intentionally manipulates accounting policies or accounting estimates to improve financial statements. Public and private corporations commit fraudulent financial reporting to secure investor interest or obtain bank approvals for financing, as justifications for bonuses or increased salaries or to meet the expectations of shareholders. The U.S. Securities and Exchange Commission has brought enforcement actions against corporations for many types of fraudulent financial reporting, including improper revenue recognition, period-end stuffing, fraudulent post-closing entries, improper asset valuations, and misleading non-GAAP financial measures.

== The fraud triangle ==
The fraud triangle is a model for explaining the factors that cause someone to commit fraudulent behaviors in accounting. It consists of three components, which, together, lead to fraudulent behavior:

- Incentives/pressure: Management or other employees have incentives or pressures to commit fraud.
- Opportunities: Circumstances provide opportunities for management or employees to commit fraud.
- Attitudes/rationalization: An attitude, character, or set of ethical values exists that allows management or employees to commit a dishonest act, or they are in an environment that imposes sufficient pressure that causes them to rationalize committing a dishonest act.

Incentives/pressures: A common incentive for companies to manipulate financial statements is a decline in the company's financial prospects. Companies may also manipulate earnings to meet analysts' forecasts or benchmarks such as prior-year earnings, to meet debt covenant restrictions, achieve a bonus target based on earnings, or artificially inflate stock prices. As for the misappropriation of assets, financial pressures are a common incentive for employees. Employees with excessive financial obligations, or those with substance abuse or gambling problems, may steal to meet their personal needs.

Opportunities: Although the financial statements of all companies are potentially subject to manipulation, the risk is greater for companies in industries where significant judgments and accounting estimates are involved. Turnover in accounting personnel or other deficiencies in accounting and information processes can create an opportunity for misstatement. As for misappropriation of assets, opportunities are greater in companies with accessible cash or with inventory or other valuable assets, especially if the assets are small or easily removed. A lack of controls over payments to vendors or payroll systems can allow employees to create fictitious vendors or employees and bill the company for services or time.

Attitudes/rationalization: The attitude of top management toward financial reporting is a critical risk factor in assessing the likelihood of fraudulent financial statements. If the CEO or other top managers display a significant disregard for the financial reporting process, such as consistently issuing overly optimistic forecasts, or if they are overly concerned about meeting analysts' earnings forecasts, fraudulent financial reporting is more likely. Similarly, for misappropriation of assets, if management cheats customers by overcharging for goods or engaging in high-pressure sales tactics, employees may feel that it is acceptable for them to behave in the same fashion.

Several extensions to the fraud triangle have been proposed in the literature. The "fraud diamond" adds a fourth element, capability, emphasizing the perpetrator’s skills and position to exploit opportunities. Subsequent work introduced the "fraud pentagon", which further incorporates arrogance (or ego) to capture the attitude of superiority that can facilitate rule-breaking; this model has been examined empirically in studies of financial reporting fraud.

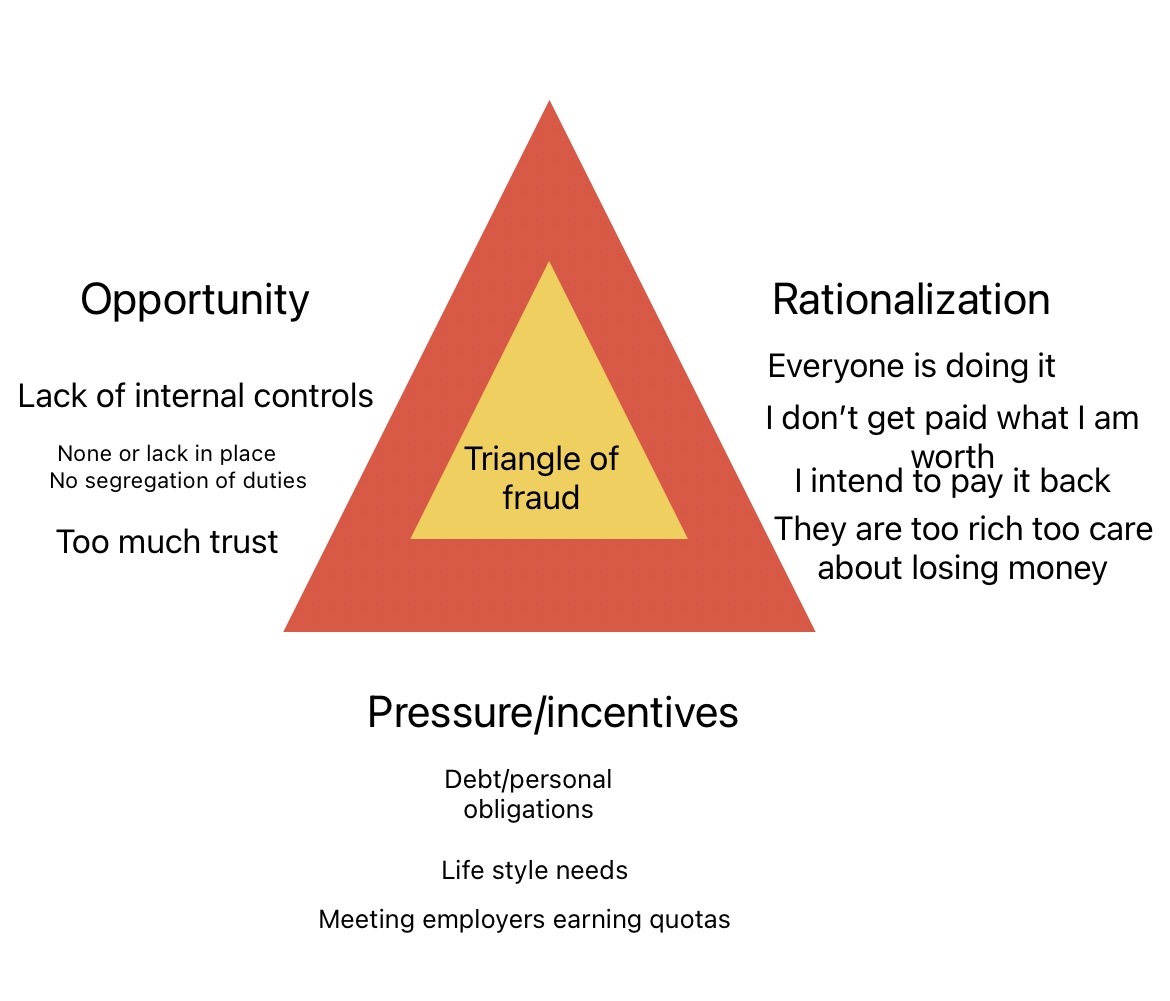
The fraud triangle. Perceived opportunities are what allow the fraudster to commit or hide fraud. Pressure/incentives are what drive motivation to commit fraud. Rationalization is how fraudsters justify their actions.

== Causes ==
Frauds such as embezzlement are easy to conceal when company records are opaque to begin with. Poor accounting, such as the absence of monthly reconciliations or an independent audit function, also indicates vulnerability to fraud.

=== Executive and managerial motivations for fraud ===
An executive can reduce the price of their company's stock due to information asymmetry. They can: accelerate accounting of expenses, delay accounting of revenue, engage in off-balance sheet transactions to make the company seem less profitable, or simply report very low estimates of future earnings. Executives may do this to make a company a more attractive takeover target. When the company is bought for less, the acquirer profits from the executive's actions to surreptitiously reduce the share price. This can represent tens of billions of dollars (questionably) transferred from former shareholders to the acquirer. The executive is then rewarded with a golden handshake for presiding over the firesale that can sometimes be in the hundreds of millions of dollars for one or two years of work. Managerial opportunism plays a large role in these scandals.

=== Employee motivations for fraud ===
Not all accounting scandals are caused by those at the top. In fact, in 2015, 33% of all business bankruptcies were caused by employee theft. Often, middle managers and employees are pressured to or willingly alter financial statements due to their debts or the possibility of personal benefit over that of the company, respectively. For example, officers who would be compensated more in the short-term (for example, cash in pocket) might be more likely to report inaccurate information on a tab or invoice (enriching the company and maybe eventually getting a raise).

== List of the biggest accounting scandals ==
Company	Year	Audit firm	Country	Notes
Fred Stern & Company	1925	Touche, Niven & Co.	United States	Trial: Ultramares Corp. v. Touche
Hatry Group	1929		United Kingdom	
Royal Mail Steam Packet Company	1931	Harold John Morland	United Kingdom	Misrepresented drawdowns from reserves as trading profits. Trial: Royal Mail Case (R v Kylsant & Otrs)
Interstate Hosiery Mills	1937	Homes and Davis	United States	
McKesson and Robbins scandal	1938	Price, Waterhouse & Co.	United States	
Yale Express System	1965	Peat, Marwick, Mitchell & Co.	United States	Overstated net worth and failed to indicate net operating loss
Atlantic Acceptance Corporation	1965	Wagman, Fruitman & Lando	Canada	CPA conflicts of interest
Continental Vending Machine Corp.	1969	Lybrand, Ross Brothers, & Montgomery	United States	CPA partners convicted and fined
National Student Marketing Corporation	1970	Peat, Marwick, Mitchell & Co.	United States	Overstatement of earnings
Four Seasons Nursing Centers of America	1970	Arthur Andersen	United States	Overstatement of earnings; CPA partners indicted
Equity Funding	1973	Wolfson Weiner; Ratoff & Lapin	United States	Created fictitious insurance policies
Fund of Funds – Investors Overseas Services	1973	Arthur Andersen	Canada	Mutual fund that inflated the value of assets
Lockheed Corporation	1976		United States	
Nugan Hand Bank	1980		Australia	
O.P.M. Leasing Services	1981	Fox & Company	United States	Created fictitious leases
ZZZZ Best	1986		United States	Ponzi scheme run by Barry Minkow
Northguard Acceptance Ltd.	1980 to 1982	Ernst & Young	Canada	
ESM Government Securities	1986	Alexander Grant & Company	United States	Bribery of CPA partner.
Bankers Trust	1988	Arthur Young & Co	United States	Hid an $80 million mispricing of derivatives contributing to profits by cutting bonuses.
Barlow Clowes	1988		United Kingdom	Gilts management service. £110 million missing
Crazy Eddie	1989		United States	
MiniScribe	1989		United States	
Livent	1989 to 1998	Deloitte & Touche	Canada	Fraud and forgery
Polly Peck	1990		United Kingdom	
Bank of Credit and Commerce International	1991		United Kingdom	
Phar-Mor	1992	Coopers & Lybrand	United States	Mail fraud, wire fraud, bank fraud, and transportation of funds obtained by theft or fraud
1992 Indian stock market scam Harshad Mehta	1992		India	Fraud, market manipulation, money laundering
Informix Corporation	1996	Ernst & Young	United States	
Gainax	1996 to 1999		Japan	Tax evasion by reporting fictitious costs for company software
Sybase	1997	Ernst & Young	United States	
Cendant	1998	Ernst & Young	United States	
Cinar	1998	Ernst & Young	Canada	Misuse of corporate funds
Waste Management, Inc.	1999	Arthur Andersen	United States	Financial misstatements
MicroStrategy	2000	PWC	United States	Michael Saylor
Unify Corporation	2000	Deloitte & Touche	United States	
Computer Associates	2000	KPMG	United States	Sanjay Kumar, Stephen Richards
Lernout & Hauspie	2000	KPMG	Belgium	Fictitious transactions in Korea and improper accounting methodologies elsewhere
Xerox	2000	KPMG	United States	Falsifying financial results
One.Tel	2001	Ernst & Young	Australia	
Enron	2001	Arthur Andersen	United States	Jeffrey Skilling, Kenneth Lay, Andrew Fastow
Swissair	2001	PricewaterhouseCoopers	Switzerland	
Adelphia	2002	Deloitte & Touche	United States	John Rigas
AOL	2002	Ernst & Young	United States	Inflated sales
Bristol-Myers Squibb	2002	PricewaterhouseCoopers	United States	Inflated revenues
CMS Energy	2002	Arthur Andersen	United States	Round trip trades
Duke Energy	2002	Deloitte & Touche	United States	Round trip trades
Vivendi Universal	2002	Arthur Andersen	France	Financial reshuffling
Dynegy	2002	Arthur Andersen	United States	Round trip trades
El Paso Corporation	2002	Deloitte & Touche	United States	Round trip trades
Freddie Mac	2002	PricewaterhouseCoopers	United States	Understated earnings
Global Crossing	2002	Arthur Andersen	Bermuda	Network capacity swaps to inflate revenues
Halliburton	2002	Arthur Andersen	United States	Improper booking of cost overruns
Homestore.com	2002	PricewaterhouseCoopers	United States	Improper booking of sales
ImClone Systems	2002	KPMG	United States	Samuel D. Waksal
Kmart	2002	PricewaterhouseCoopers	United States	Misleading accounting practices
Merck & Co.	2002	PricewaterhouseCoopers	United States	Recorded co-payments that were not collected
Merrill Lynch	2002	Deloitte & Touche	United States	Conflict of interest
Mirant	2002	KPMG	United States	Overstated assets and liabilities
Nicor	2002	Arthur Andersen	United States	Overstated assets, understated liabilities
Peregrine Systems	2002	Arthur Andersen	United States	Overstated sales
Qwest Communications	2002	Arthur Andersen (1999, 2000, 2001) KPMG (2002 October)	United States	Inflated revenues
Reliant Energy	2002	Deloitte & Touche	United States	Round trip trades
Sunbeam	2002	Arthur Andersen	United States	Overstated sales and revenues
Symbol Technologies	2002		United States	
Steinhoff International	2002		United States	Overstated sales and revenues
Tyco International	2002	PricewaterhouseCoopers	Bermuda	Improper accounting, Dennis Kozlowski
WorldCom	2002	Arthur Andersen	United States	Fraudulent expense capitalization, Bernard Ebbers
Royal Ahold	2003	Deloitte & Touche	United States	Inflating promotional allowances
Parmalat	2003	Grant Thornton SpA	Italy	Falsified accounting documents, Calisto Tanzi
HealthSouth Corporation	2003	Ernst & Young	United States	Richard M. Scrushy
Nortel	2003	Deloitte & Touche	Canada	Distributed ill-advised corporate bonuses to top 43 managers
Chiquita Brands International	2004	Ernst & Young	United States	Illegal payments
AIG	2004	PricewaterhouseCoopers	United States	Accounting of structured financial deals
Bernard L. Madoff Investment Securities LLC	2008	Friehling & Horowitz	United States	Biggest Ponzi scheme in history
Anglo Irish Bank	2008	Ernst & Young	Ireland	Anglo Irish Bank hidden loans controversy
Satyam Computer Services	2009	PricewaterhouseCoopers	India	Falsified accounts
Biovail	2009		Canada	False statements
Taylor, Bean & Whitaker	2009	PricewaterhouseCoopers	United States	Fraudulent spending
Monsanto	2009 to 2011	Deloitte	United States	Improper accounting for incentive rebates
Kinross Gold	2010	KPMG	Canada	Overstated asset values
Lehman Brothers	2010	Ernst & Young	United States	Failure to disclose Repo 105 misclassified transactions to investors
National Stock Exchange of India NSE co-location scam	2010		India	Fraud and Market manipulation
Amir-Mansour Aria	2011	IAO (audit organization) and other audit firms	Iran	Business loans without putting any collateral and financial system
Bank Saderat Iran	2011	IAO (audit organization) and other audit firms	Iran	Financial transactions among banks and getting a lot of business loans without putting any collateral
Sino-Forest Corporation	2011	Ernst & Young	Canada-China	Ponzi scheme, falsifying assets
Olympus Corporation	2011	Ernst & Young	Japan	Tobashi using acquisitions
Autonomy Corporation	2012	Deloitte & Touche	United States	Subsidiary of HP
Penn West Exploration	2012 to 2014	KPMG	Canada	Overstated profits
Pescanova	2013	BDO Spain	Spain	Understated debt, fraudulent invoices, falsified accounts
Petrobras	2014	PricewaterhouseCoopers	Brazil	Government bribes, misappropriation, money laundering
Tesco	2014	PricewaterhouseCoopers	United Kingdom	Revenue recognition
Toshiba	2015	Ernst & Young	Japan	Overstated profits
Valeant Pharmaceuticals	2015	PricewaterhouseCoopers	Canada	Overstated revenues
Alberta Motor Association	2016		Canada	Fraudulent invoices
Odebrecht	2016		Brazil	Government bribes
Wells Fargo	2017	KPMG	United States	False accounting
1Malaysia Development Berhad	2018	Ernst & Young, Deloitte, KPMG	Malaysia	Fraud, money laundering, abuse of political power, government bribes
Wirecard	2020	Ernst & Young	Germany	Allegations of fraud
Luckin Coffee	2020	Ernst & Young	China	Inflated its 2019 sales revenue by up to US$310 million
Adani Group	2023	Shah Dhandharia	India	Allegations of accounting fraud, stock manipulation, money laundering
Americanas	2023	KPMG and PWC	Brazil	Accounting inconsistencies related to forfeit, on the order of R$20 billion
Evergrande	2023	PWC	China	Revenue overstatement on the order of $78 billion from 2019–2020, leading to the Evergrande liquidity crisis
BF Borgers	2024		United States	

== Notable outcomes ==
The Enron scandal turned into the indictment and criminal conviction of Big Five auditor Arthur Andersen on June 15, 2002. Although the conviction was overturned on May 31, 2005, by the Supreme Court of the United States, the firm ceased performing audits and split into multiple entities. The Enron scandal was defined as one of the biggest audit failures of all time. The scandal included utilizing loopholes that were found within the Generally Accepted Accounting Principles (GAAP). For auditing a large-sized company such as Enron, the auditors were criticized for having brief meetings a few times a year that covered large amounts of material. By January 17, 2002, Enron decided to discontinue its business with Arthur Andersen, claiming they had failed in accounting advice and related documents. Arthur Andersen was judged guilty of obstruction of justice for disposing of many emails and documents that were related to auditing Enron. Since the SEC is not allowed to accept audits from convicted felons, the firm was forced to give up its CPA licenses later in 2002, costing over 113,000 employees their jobs. Although the ruling was later overturned by the U.S. Supreme Court, the once-proud firm's image was tarnished beyond repair, and it has not returned as a viable business even on a limited scale.

On July 9, 2002, George W. Bush gave a speech about recent accounting scandals that had been uncovered. In spite of its stern tone, the speech did not focus on establishing new policy, but instead focused on actually enforcing current laws, which include holding CEOs and directors personally responsible for accountancy fraud.

In July 2002, WorldCom filed for bankruptcy protection in what was considered at the time the largest corporate insolvency ever. A month earlier, the company's internal auditors discovered over $3.8 billion in illicit accounting entries intended to mask WorldCom's dwindling earnings, which was by itself more than the accounting fraud uncovered at Enron less than a year earlier. Ultimately, WorldCom admitted to inflating its assets by $11 billion.

These scandals reignited the debate over the relative merits of US GAAP, which takes a "rules-based" approach to accounting, versus International Accounting Standards and UK GAAP, which takes a "principles-based" approach. The Financial Accounting Standards Board announced that it intends to introduce more principles-based standards. More radical means of accounting reform have been proposed, but so far have very little support. The debate itself overlooks the difficulties of classifying any system of knowledge, including accounting, as rules-based or principles-based. This also led to the establishment of the Sarbanes-Oxley Act. On a lighter note, the 2002 Ig Nobel Prize in Economics went to the CEOs of those companies involved in the corporate accounting scandals of that year for "adapting the mathematical concept of imaginary numbers for use in the business world".

In 2003, Nortel made a big contribution to this list of scandals by incorrectly reporting a one-cent per share earnings directly after their massive layoff period. They used this money to pay the top 43 managers of the company. The SEC and the Ontario Securities Commission eventually settled a civil action with Nortel. A separate civil action was taken against top Nortel executives, including former CEO Frank A. Dunn, Douglas C. Beatty, Michael J. Gollogly, and MaryAnne E. Pahapill and Hamilton. These proceedings were postponed pending criminal proceedings in Canada, which opened in Toronto on January 12, 2012. Crown lawyers at this fraud trial of three former Nortel Networks executives say the men defrauded the shareholders of Nortel of more than $5 million. According to the prosecutor, this was accomplished by engineering a financial loss in 2002, and a profit in 2003, thereby triggering Return to Profit bonuses of $70 million for top executives. In 2007, Dunn, Beatty, Gollogly, Pahapill, Hamilton, Craig A. Johnson, James B. Kinney, and Kenneth R.W. Taylor were charged with engaging in accounting fraud by "manipulating reserves to manage Nortel's earnings".

In 2005, after a scandal involving insurance and mutual funds the year before, AIG was investigated for accounting fraud. The company already lost over $45 billion worth of market capitalization because of the scandal. Investigations also discovered over $1 billion worth of errors in accounting transactions. The New York Attorney General's investigation led to a $1.6 billion fine for AIG and criminal charges for some of its executives. CEO Maurice R. "Hank" Greenberg was forced to step down and fought fraud charges until 2017, when the 91-year-old reached a $9.9 million settlement. Howard Smith, AIG's chief financial officer, also reached a settlement.

Well before Bernard Madoff's massive Ponzi scheme came to light, observers doubted whether his listed accounting firm – an unknown two-person firm in a rural area north of New York City – was competent to service a multibillion-dollar operation, especially since it had only one active accountant, David G. Friehling. Friehling's practice was so small that for years, he operated out of his house; he only moved into an office when Madoff customers wanted to know more about who was auditing his accounts. Ultimately, Friehling admitted to simply rubber-stamping at least 18 years' worth of Madoff's filings with the SEC. He also revealed that he continued to audit Madoff even though he had invested a substantial amount of money with him; accountants are not allowed to audit broker-dealers with whom they are investing. He agreed to forfeit $3.18 million in accounting fees and withdrawals from his account with Madoff. His involvement makes the Madoff scheme not only the largest Ponzi scheme ever uncovered, but the largest accounting fraud in world history. The $64.8 billion claimed to be in Madoff accounts dwarfed the $11 billion fraud at WorldCom.

== See also ==
- 2008 financial crisis
- Accounting ethics
- Corporate crime
- Creative accounting
- Dot-com bubble
- Forensic accounting
- Hollywood accounting
- List of corporate collapses and scandals
- Microcap stock fraud
- Philosophy of accounting
- Repo 105
- Sarbanes–Oxley Act
- Savings and loan crisis
- Securities fraud
- Tobashi scheme
- Vivien v. WorldCom
- White-collar crime
