= Big Review TV =

- Type: Subsidiary
- Industry: Software & Services
- Founded: May 2013 in New South Wales, Australia
- Founder: Brandon Evertz
- Defunct: May 2018
- Fate: Voluntary administration
- Headquarters: Sydney, Australia
- Key people: Brandon Evertz (Founder, Executive Director); Richard Evertz (Former CEO); Sonia Thurston (Executive Director); Hugh Massie (Former Chairman)
- Revenue: AUD$13,973,339 (2017)
- Parent: Big Un Ltd ASX: BIG
- Website: bigreviewtv.com

Big Review TV was a company founded by Brandon Evertz, in May 2013.

== Overview ==
Big Review TV operated in the media and technology space providing online video content, video reviews and online marketing services for consumers and small and medium enterprises and businesses in Australia, the United Kingdom, and the United States. It offered a video-driven review platform that integrated video; Internet, social media, a mobile phone video review application, and TV review shows.

== History ==
Big Review TV was allegedly started from a $500 loan by Brandon Evertz's father and became one of Australia's fastest growing companies. It reversed listed through a parent company on the Australian Securities exchange via Republic Gold Limited.

== Voluntary administration ==
Big Review TV was placed into voluntary administration to allow a restructure of the business and to preserve value for shareholders. The company could not overcome its accounting mishaps and went under shortly thereafter. A director's report in May 2018 showed that the company had a $47 million asset deficit, with secured creditors holding a $57 million claim on the company's assets.

== See also ==
- Accounting scandals
- Enron scandal
