= Scott Sullivan =

Scott Sullivan may refer to:

- Scott D. Sullivan, accountant and executive involved in the WorldCom scandal
- Scott Sullivan (baseball) (born 1971), baseball pitcher
- Scott Sullivan (politician), speaker pro tempore of the Arkansas House of Representatives
- Scott M. Sullivan, American professor of philosophy
