= Audit regime =

An audit regime is usually a rigorous set of forensic accounting methods that is used to detect fraud. It refers more generally however to any similar regime of verification of conformity to some standard, e.g. Kyoto Protocol, Harkin–Engel Protocol, or some mandatory labeling scheme. Without such a regime, transparency is simply not attainable.

Most accounting reform includes strict audit measures to verify that new standards are met.

Financial privacy is often in direct conflict with the desire for any stricter audit regimes.

Characteristics of an effective audit regime include:

- harsh penalties for any misleading or fraudulent disclosures to the auditor that are strictly enforced
- publicly visible reports and definitions, e.g. for capital categories
- an incorruptible profession of auditors that adheres to strict ethical codes, and whose careers are permanently and irrevocably destroyed by any serious impropriety
- strict standards to declare conflict of interest, and rules to prevent competitive arrangements that tend to create such conflicts, e.g. not permitting the auditor to also act as a consultant on meeting the regime's requirements.

After major accounting scandals in the United States that became publicly visible in 2001 and 2002, and the controversies about various ways of claiming carbon credits under the Kyoto Protocol, there has been increasing attention paid to audit regimes in the English speaking world. This has often focused on bringing United States standards up to the level of much stricter United Kingdom or European Union standards, which are of more recent origins.

== International standards ==
Modern audit regimes often reference internationally recognized frameworks for transparency and verification. The International Organization for Standardization (ISO) publishes audit requirements through standards such as ISO 19011, which provides guidelines for auditing management systems, including principles of integrity, evidence-based assessment, and impartiality. These frameworks are widely used in environmental, quality, and compliance audits across the public and private sectors.

== See also ==
- Forensics
- Fraud
