= WorldCom scandal =

Telecom company financial scandal

The WorldCom scandal was a major accounting scandal discovered in June 2002 at WorldCom, then the second-largest long-distance telephone company in the United States. Between 1999 and 2002, senior executives led by founder and CEO Bernard Ebbers engaged in accounting fraud to inflate earnings and maintain the company's stock price.

The fraud was discovered by the company's internal audit unit under Vice President Cynthia Cooper, who identified over $3.8 billion in fraudulent balance sheet entries. Subsequent investigations revealed that WorldCom had overstated its assets by over $11 billion, making it the largest accounting fraud in American history at that time. WorldCom filed for bankruptcy in July 2002 and CEO Ebbers was sentenced to 25 years in prison in 2005.

== Background ==
In December 2000, WorldCom financial analyst Kim Emigh was told to allocate labor for capital projects in WorldCom's network systems division as capital expenditure rather than operating costs. By Emigh's estimate, the order would have affected at least $35 million in capital spending. Believing that he was being asked to commit tax fraud, Emigh pressed his concerns up the chain of command, notifying an assistant to WorldCom chief operating officer Ron Beaumont. Within 24 hours, it was decided not to implement the directive. However, Emigh was reprimanded by his immediate superiors and subsequently laid off in March 2001.

Emigh, who was from the MCI half of the 1997 WorldCom/MCI merger, later told Fort Worth Weekly in May 2002 that he had expressed concerns about MCI's spending habits for years. He believed that things had been reined in somewhat after WorldCom took over, but he was still unnerved by vendors billing WorldCom for exorbitant amounts. The Fort Worth Weekly article was eventually read by Glyn Smith, an internal audit manager at WorldCom headquarters in Clinton, Mississippi. After examining it, he suggested to his boss, Cynthia Cooper, that she should start that year's scheduled capital expenditure audit a few months early. Cooper agreed, and the audit began in late May.

== Prepaid capacity ==
During the audit, corporate finance director Sanjeev Sethi informed auditors that discrepancies in capital spending expenditures were related to "prepaid capacity," a term unfamiliar to Cooper. When questioned further, Sethi claimed he did not understand the term despite his division's role in approving capital spending requests, and referred the auditors to corporate controller David Myers. Cooper requested an auditor with technical skills to locate the entries in the accounting system. Eugene Morse, an accountant who had worked at WorldCom since 1997, was assigned to assist with the investigation.

Cooper approached Mark Abide, head of property at WorldCom, for clarification on prepaid capacity. Abide claimed unfamiliarity with the term despite having made multiple entries related to it in the computerized accounting system. He identified the relevant accounts as furniture, fixtures, and other equipment, as well as transmission and communications equipment.

Morse searched the accounting system for references to prepaid capacity and located entries that showed unusual movement of large amounts between accounts. The audit team used basic T accounts to analyze the entries, which revealed funds moving from WorldCom's income statement to its balance sheet in an irregular pattern.

David Myers sent emails to Cooper questioning the capital expenditure audit, stating it was wasteful and tied up needed employees. Cooper continued the investigation despite this resistance. To avoid detection due to increased server activity from data extraction, the audit team began working at night. On June 10, they discovered additional prepaid capacity entries showing large transfers from the income statement to the balance sheet from the third quarter of 2001 to the first quarter of 2002.

== Discovery and escalation ==
WorldCom chief financial officer Scott D. Sullivan met with Cooper regarding audit projects and requested a review of recently completed audits. When questioned about the prepaid capacity entries, Sullivan explained they referred to costs related to SONET and lines with low or no usage. He stated these costs were being capitalized because line lease costs remained fixed despite declining revenue. Sullivan indicated he planned to take a restructuring charge in the second quarter of 2002, after which WorldCom would allocate these costs between restructuring charges and expenses. He requested that Cooper postpone the capital-expenditure audit until the third quarter.

Cooper and Smith contacted Max Bobbitt, a WorldCom board member and chairman of the Audit Committee, to discuss their findings. Bobbitt directed Cooper to consult with Farrell Malone of KPMG, WorldCom's external auditor. KPMG had acquired the WorldCom account when it purchased Arthur Andersen's Jackson practice following Andersen's indictment in the Enron accounting scandal.

The internal audit team had identified 28 prepaid capacity entries dating to the second quarter of 2001. Their analysis indicated that without these entries, WorldCom's reported $130 million profit in the first quarter of 2002 would have been a $395 million loss. Bobbitt considered it premature to present the matter to the full Audit Committee and discussed the findings with Sullivan, assuring Cooper that supporting documentation would be provided by the following Monday.

== Fraud revealed ==
Cooper questioned the accountants who made the prepaid capacity entries to obtain supporting documentation. Kenny Avery, Andersen's former lead partner on the WorldCom account before KPMG's takeover, was unfamiliar with prepaid capacity and stated that no Generally Accepted Accounting Principles (GAAP) standards allowed for capitalizing line costs. Andersen had not tested WorldCom's capital expenditures in this area.

Betty Vinson, the accounting director who made the entries, admitted she had processed them without understanding their purpose or seeing supporting documentation, acting on directions from Myers and general accounting director Buford Yates. Yates also claimed unfamiliarity with prepaid capacity and stated that accountants under his supervision booked entries at Myers' direction.

Myers acknowledged there was no support for the entries, stating they had been booked "based on what we thought the margins should be" without accounting standards justification. He admitted the entries should not have been made, but claimed it became difficult to stop once started. Although uncomfortable with the entries, he had not anticipated having to explain them to regulators.

KPMG's Farrell concluded that the rationale for the entries made sense "from a business perspective, but not an accounting perspective" after meeting with Sullivan and Myers. In response, Sullivan, Myers, Yates, and Abide attempted to identify expenses that should have been capitalized to offset the prepaid capacity entries, believing the only alternative was an earnings restatement.

An Audit Committee meeting was scheduled for June 20. Cooper's team had discovered over $3 billion in questionable transfers from line cost expense accounts to assets from 2001 to 2002. At the meeting, Farrell stated that GAAP provided no justification for the entries. Sullivan argued that WorldCom had invested in telecom network expansion from 1999, but anticipated customer usage increases never materialized. He contended the entries were justified under the matching principle, which allows costs to be recorded as expenses aligned with future asset benefits. Sullivan proposed a restructuring or "impairment charge" for the second quarter of 2002, claiming Myers could provide supporting documentation. The committee required this support by the following Monday.

The internal audit unit ultimately discovered 49 prepaid capacity entries totaling $3.8 billion in transfers across 2001 and the first quarter of 2002. Several entries were labeled "SS entry," indicating explicit directions from Sullivan and Myers. While some suspicious entries were made by directors and managers, others were processed by lower-level accountants unaware of their significance. Accounting director Troy Normand revealed additional questionable practices, stating that management had drawn down company cost reserves in portions of 2000 and 2001 to artificially reduce expenses.

KPMG's independent review found that Sullivan had moved system costs across multiple property accounts to book them as capital expenditures, with expenses spread to avoid detection. Former Andersen accountants stated they would not have approved the entries if aware of them. Sullivan was required to provide written explanation for his actions.

At the subsequent Audit Committee meeting, Sullivan presented a white paper explaining his reasoning. The Audit Committee and KPMG concluded that the amounts were transferred solely to meet Wall Street targets, and determined that restating corporate earnings for all of 2001 and the first quarter of 2002 was the only acceptable remedy. Andersen withdrew its 2001 audit opinion, and the board demanded Sullivan and Myers' resignations.

== SEC investigation ==
On June 25, after confirming the amount of illicit entries, the board accepted Myers' resignation and terminated Sullivan when he refused to resign. WorldCom executives briefed the SEC the same day, revealing that the company would need to restate earnings for the previous five quarters. WorldCom publicly disclosed that it had overstated its income by over $3.8 billion over the previous five quarters.

Prior to the scandal's disclosure, WorldCom's credit rating had been reduced to junk status, and its stock had declined over 94 percent. The company was already facing a separate SEC accounting investigation that had begun earlier in 2002, and carried $30 billion in debt. WorldCom announced plans to lay off 17,000 employees. The company filed for Chapter 11 bankruptcy protection on July 21, 2002.

The federal government had begun an informal inquiry in June when Vinson, Yates, and Normand met with SEC and Justice Department officials. The SEC filed civil fraud charges against WorldCom on June 26, alleging that the company had engaged in a concerted effort to manipulate earnings to meet Wall Street targets and support its stock price. The SEC stated that the scheme had been "directed and approved by senior management," suggesting involvement by executives above Sullivan and Myers, including CEO Bernard Ebbers.

== Trial ==
In 2005, a jury found CEO Bernard Ebbers guilty of fraud, conspiracy, and filing false documents with regulators. He was subsequently sentenced to 25 years in prison. However, he was released in December 2019 due to declining health. Ebbers died February 2, 2020.

== Aftermath ==
The Sarbanes–Oxley Act was passed in the wake of several business scandals, including those at WorldCom and Enron.

WorldCom, renamed MCI, was acquired by Verizon Communications in January 2006.
