= Lansdale, Pennsylvania =

Borough in Pennsylvania, United States

Lansdale
- Borough
- Main Street in Lansdale

- Flag Seal Logo
- Motto: Life in Motion
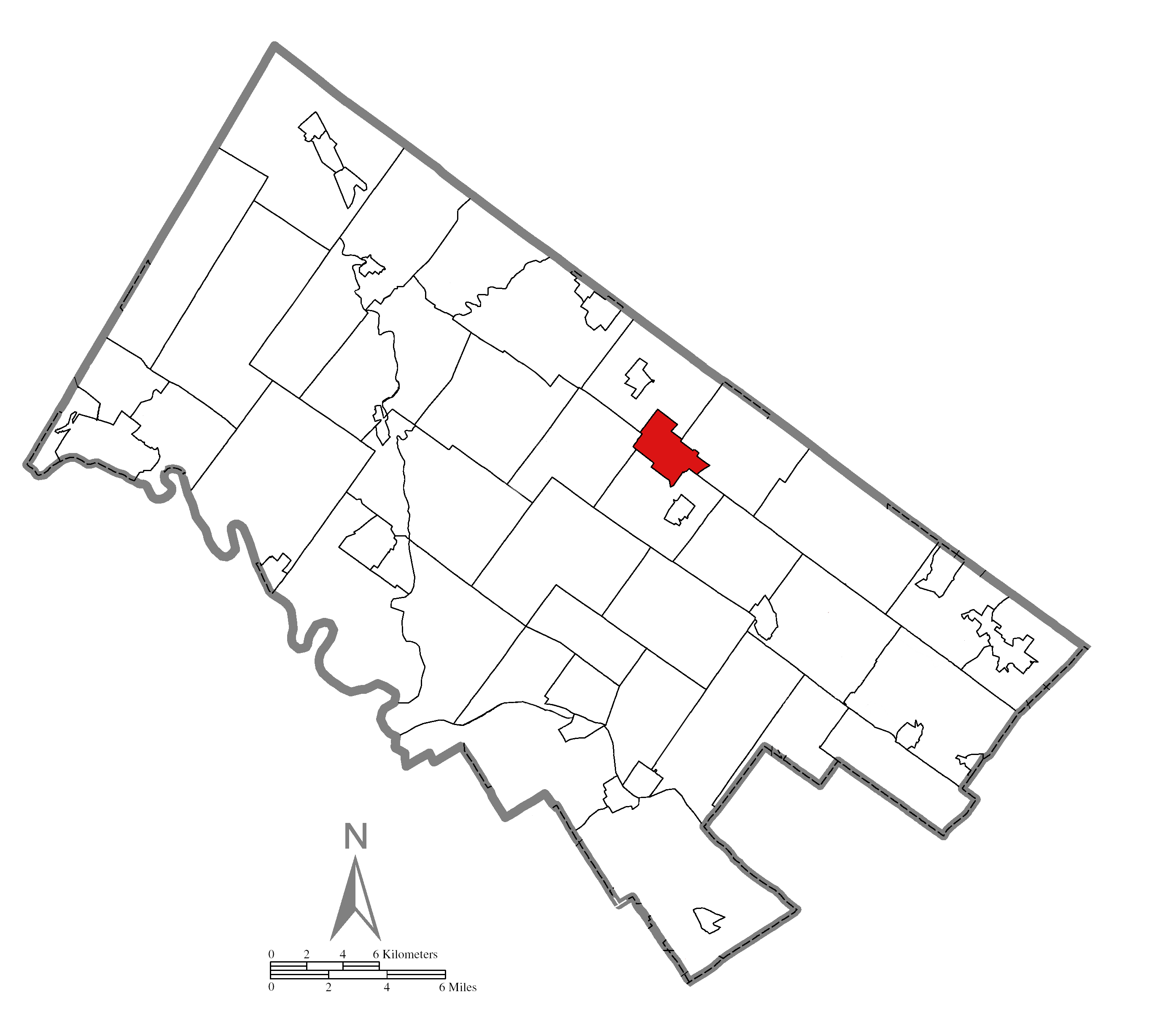
- Location of Lansdale in Montgomery County, Pennsylvania

- Location of Lansdale in Pennsylvania Lansdale (the United States)
- Coordinates: 40°14′31″N 75°17′03″W
- Country: United States
- State: Pennsylvania
- County: Montgomery

Government
  - Type: Council-manager
  - Mayor: Rachael Bollens

Area
  - Total: 2.99 sq mi (7.75 km^{2})
  - Land: 2.99 sq mi (7.75 km^{2})
  - Water: 0 sq mi (0.00 km^{2})
- Elevation: 361 ft (110 m)

Population (2020)
  - Total: 18,773
  - Estimate (2025): 18,986 ▲
  - Density: 6,273.3/sq mi (2,422.12/km^{2})
- Time zone: UTC-5 (EST)
  - Summer (DST): UTC-4 (EDT)
- ZIP Code: 19446
- Area codes: 215, 267 and 445
- FIPS code: 42-41432
- Website: www.lansdale.org

Lansdale is a borough in Montgomery County, Pennsylvania, United States. It is a densely populated commuter town, with many residents traveling daily to Philadelphia using SEPTA Regional Rail's Lansdale/Doylestown Line. In the year 1900, 2,754 people lived here; in 1910, 3,551; and in 1940, 9,316 people were inhabitants of Lansdale. The population was 18,773 at the 2020 census and estimated at 18,986 in 2025

Lansdale is the center of the North Penn Valley, a region which includes the surrounding townships and boroughs. It is located 27 miles (43 km) southeast of Allentown and 21 miles (34 km) north of Philadelphia.

== History ==
=== Founding ===
The earliest known settlers in Lansdale were members of the Jenkins family. At the peak of its growth, the Jenkins homestead occupied approximately 120 acres of land. The construction of the North Pennsylvania Railroad (later absorbed into the Reading Railroad) during the 1850s contributed to rapid growth and expansion in Lansdale. Employment opportunities generated by the railroad brought settlers, housing, and local businesses to the area.

=== Borough incorporation ===
By 1872, Lansdale Borough was officially incorporated and named after Phillip Lansdale Fox, chief surveyor of the North Penn Railroad. By the naming conventions of the time, it should have been called Jenkintown, since the land immediately surrounding the train station was owned by the Jenkins family, but there was already a town by that name along the rail line.

The Jenkins Homestead and Lansdale Silk Hosiery Compy-Interstate Hosiery Mills, Inc. are listed on the National Register of Historic Places.

=== Kugel ball ===
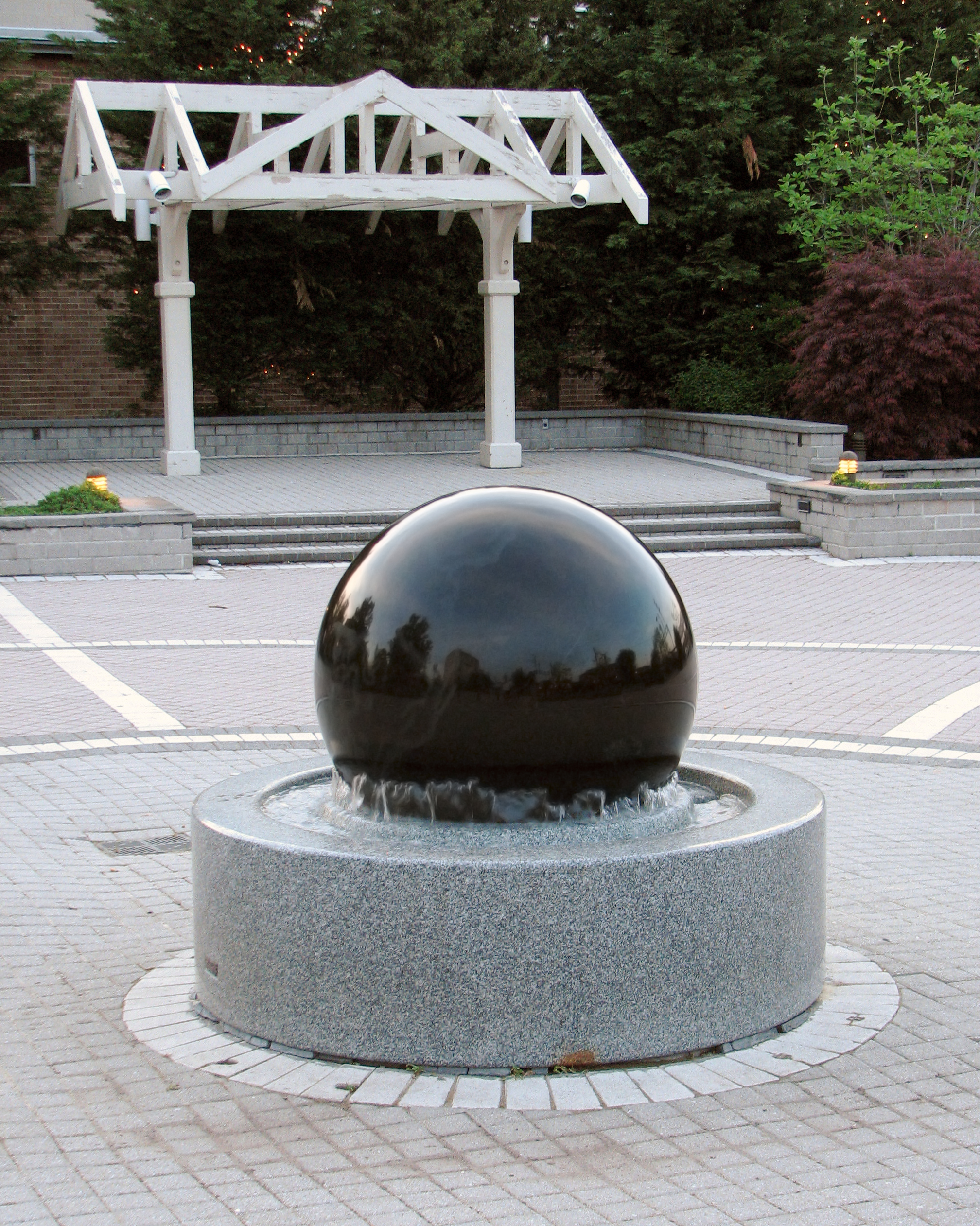
The Kugel Ball

Lansdale is home to a Kugel ball, which is a 2,200 lb (1,000 kg) dark grey granite sphere supported by a very thin film of water pumped from beneath its base. The Kugel Ball is located in Railroad Plaza, adjacent to the SEPTA Lansdale/Doylestown Line train station in downtown Lansdale. The plaza consists of a bricked patio with benches centered on the Kugel Ball and closes at 11:00 pm. An annual 5k race is held in June, accordingly named the Kugel Ball race, which starts and ends at the actual Kugel Ball in Railroad Plaza.

=== Hometown heroes ===
The Lansdale Borough Hometown Heroes Banner Program is a living tribute created for the community to recognize and honor Lansdale Veterans who are serving or are veterans who have served in the United States Armed Forces.

== Geography ==
According to the U.S. Census Bureau, the borough has a total area of 3.1 square miles (8.0 km^{2}), all land. It has a hot-summer humid continental climate (Dfa) and the hardiness zone is 7a. The average monthly temperature ranges from 30.2 °F in January to 74.7 °F in July. The average annual absolute minimum temperature is -0.4 °F.

== Demographics ==
Historical population
Census	Pop.	Note	%±
1880	798		—
1890	1,858		132.8%
1900	2,754		48.2%
1910	3,551		28.9%
1920	4,728		33.1%
1930	8,379		77.2%
1940	9,316		11.2%
1950	9,762		4.8%
1960	12,612		29.2%
1970	18,451		46.3%
1980	16,526		−10.4%
1990	16,362		−1.0%
2000	16,071		−1.8%
2010	16,269		1.2%
2020	18,773		15.4%
2025 (est.)	18,986		1.1%

=== 2020 census ===
As of the 2020 census, Lansdale had a population of 18,773. The median age was 38.0 years. 21.6% of residents were under the age of 18 and 16.3% of residents were 65 years of age or older. For every 100 females there were 96.3 males, and for every 100 females age 18 and over there were 95.1 males age 18 and over.

100.0% of residents lived in urban areas, while 0.0% lived in rural areas.

There were 7,126 households in Lansdale, of which 31.1% had children under the age of 18 living in them. Of all households, 44.4% were married-couple households, 21.8% were households with a male householder and no spouse or partner present, and 26.0% were households with a female householder and no spouse or partner present. About 29.7% of all households were made up of individuals and 9.2% had someone living alone who was 65 years of age or older.

There were 7,583 housing units, of which 6.0% were vacant. The homeowner vacancy rate was 1.1% and the rental vacancy rate was 8.6%.

Racial composition as of the 2020 census
Race	Number	Percent
White	12,314	65.6%
Black or African American	1,432	7.6%
American Indian and Alaska Native	66	0.4%
Asian	3,021	16.1%
Native Hawaiian and Other Pacific Islander	22	0.1%
Some other race	707	3.8%
Two or more races	1,211	6.5%
Hispanic or Latino (of any race)	1,563	8.3%

=== 2010 census ===
As of the 2010 census, the borough was 75.9% White, 5.9% Black or African American, 0.2% Native American, 13.3% Asian, 0.1% Native Hawaiian, and 2.7% were two or more races. 4.4% of the population were of Hispanic or Latino ancestry.

== Government ==
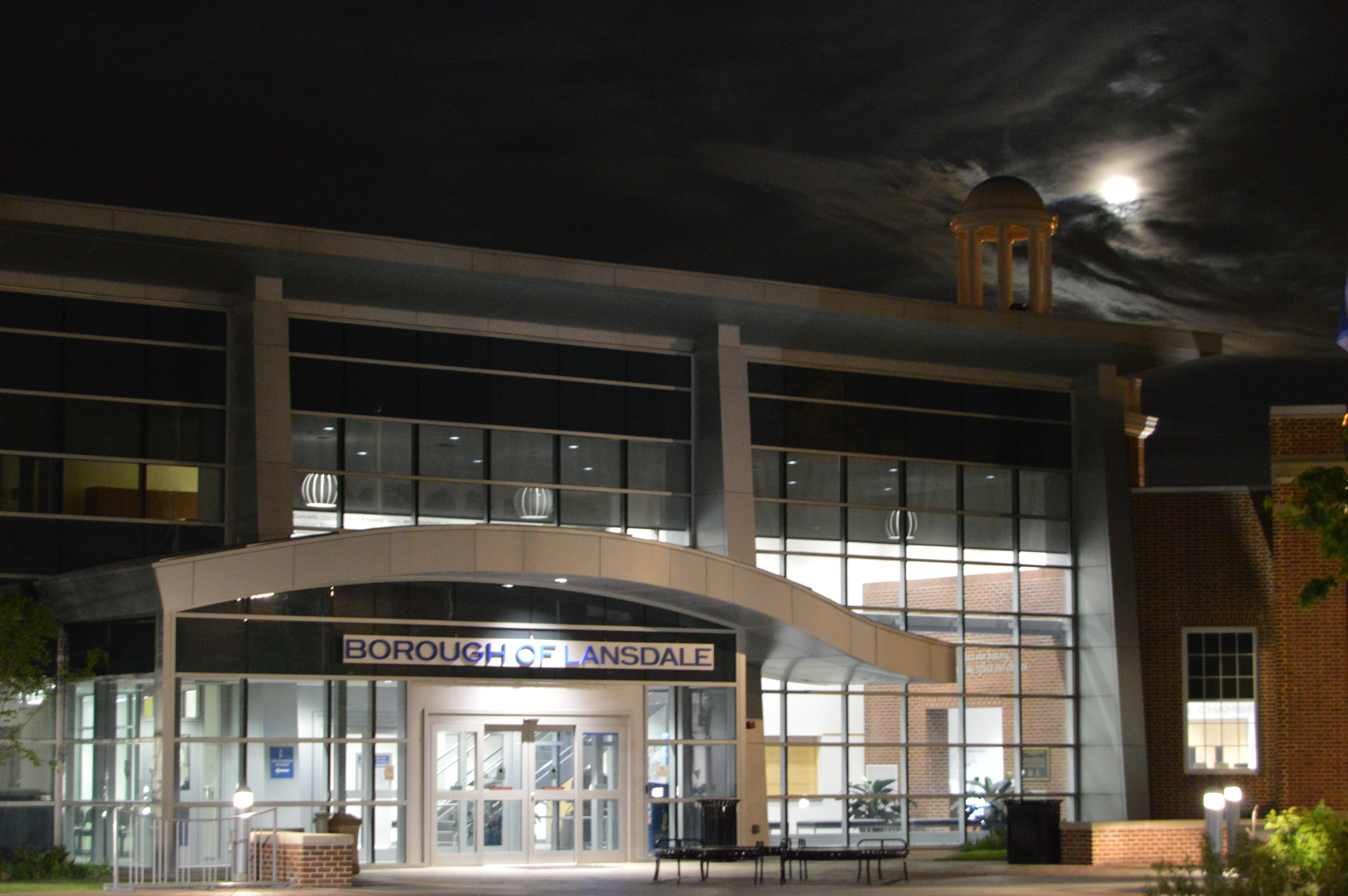
Lansdale Municipal building

Presidential elections results
Year	Republican	Democratic
2020	32.9% 3,045	65.4% 6,060
2016	33.9% 2,643	60.2% 4,697
2012	36.4% 2,579	61.7% 4,369
2008	35.8% 2,587	63.2% 4,561
2004	42.0% 2,934	57.2% 4,000
2000	46.3% 2,655	49.6% 2,843

Lansdale has a city manager form of government with a mayor and a nine-member borough council.

The borough is part of the Fourth Congressional District (represented by Rep. Madeleine Dean), Pennsylvania's 53rd Representative District (represented by Rep. Steve Malagari) and the 12th State Senate District (represented by Sen. Maria Collett).

== Education ==
The community is a part of the North Penn School District. K-6 public elementary schools in Lansdale include Gwynedd Square Elementary, Knapp Elementary, Oak Park Elementary, Inglewood Elementary, Walton Farm Elementary, and York Avenue Elementary. Penndale Middle School serves grades 7–9. The area public high school is North Penn High School in Towamencin Township.

The borough is also home to Mater Dei Catholic School of the Roman Catholic Archdiocese of Philadelphia. It was formerly home to St. Stanislaus School. In January 2012, the archdiocese announced that St. Rose of Lima School in North Wales would be merging with St. Stanislaus, with students attending classes in Lansdale at St. Stanislaus. The newly combined school was renamed from St. Stanislaus to Mater Dei, Latin for "Mother of God."

Calvary Baptist School is a pre-K-12th grade Christian school. Lansdale area private high schools include Lansdale Catholic High School and Dock Mennonite Academy. Dock is in Towamencin Township.

The DeSales University Lansdale Area Campus was an institute of higher education, with a campus specifically designed for adult students. The campus closed in 2019, with classes moved to the main campus in Center Valley or online.

== Media ==
Lansdale is served by the daily print newspaper The Reporter, owned by the Digital First Media and with a circulation of 16,364 throughout Lansdale, Hatfield, Souderton, and Harleysville. As well as the online news sites North Penn Now and Montgomeryville-Lansdale Patch.

WNPV (1440 AM) was a radio station broadcasting a news/talk/sports format, whose air date began October 17, 1960 and ended April 30, 2020. The station sold off its land, studio and broadcast towers to North Penn School District in July 2020. Its license was donated to Four Rivers Community Broadcasting.

North Penn Television is a television station owned by the North Penn School district that broadcasts the North Penn School District Board of School Directors meetings, along with various events around the school district such as sports games and concerts.

== Arts and entertainment ==
Lansdale hosts a first friday during the warmer months, it includes live music, food trucks, a beer garden, and local events like scavenger hunts or food drives.

Every September Lansdale is home to Bike Night, where thousands of motorcyclists gather.

The Rock Den was a music store that hosted weekly open mic nights and shows. It was located in the former Stuart’s music building that has been home to a music store since the 1940s.

In 2022, a documentary "Lansdale, Then, Now and Forever" was released about the local music scene. Directed by Jason Zoblin.

== Infrastructure ==
=== Transportation ===
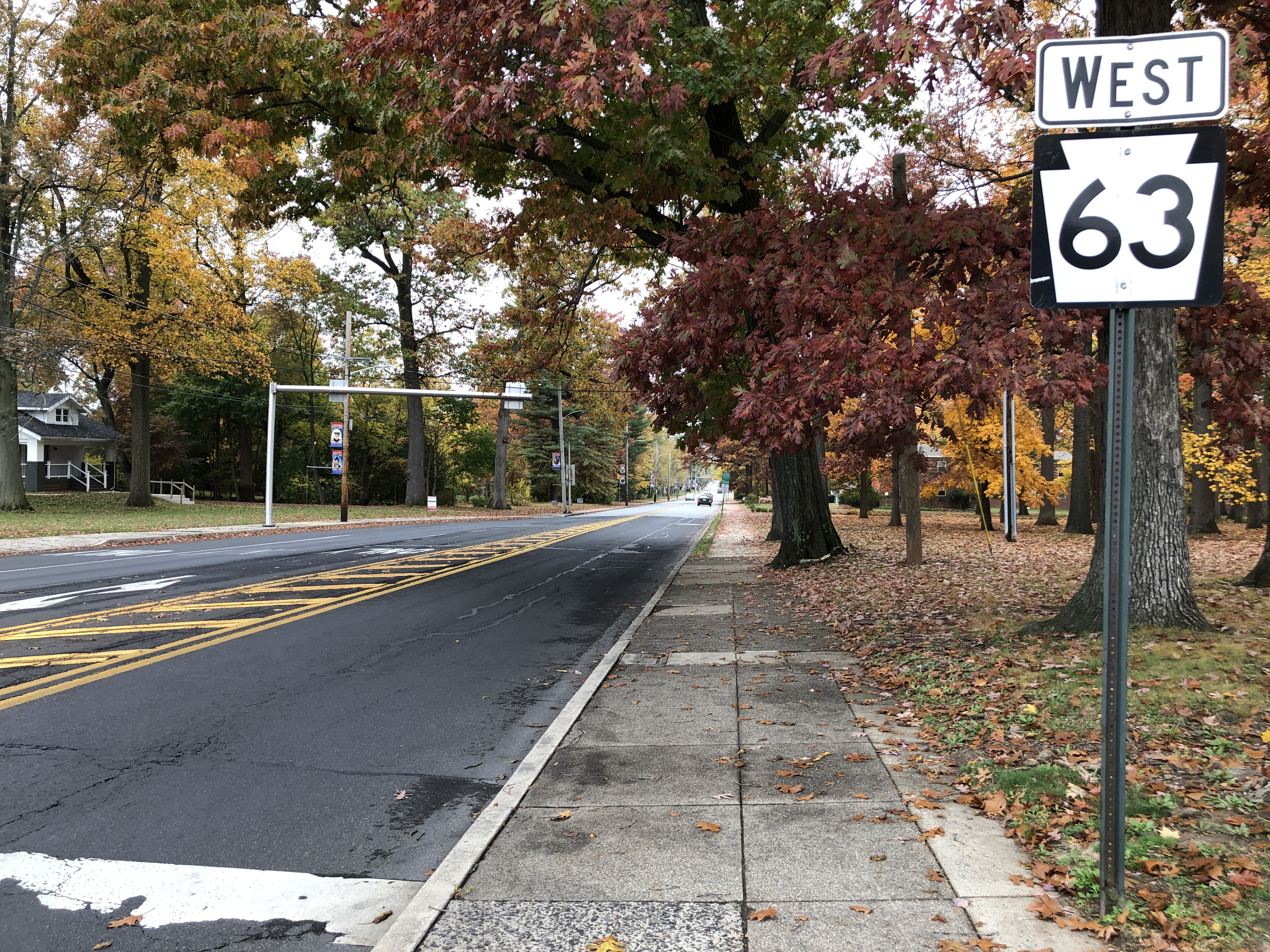
PA 63 westbound in Lansdale

As of 2010 there were 46.25 miles (74.43 km) of public roads in Lansdale, of which 3.29 miles (5.29 km) were maintained by the Pennsylvania Department of Transportation (PennDOT) and 42.96 miles (69.14 km) were maintained by the borough.

The main east–west street in Lansdale is Main Street (Pennsylvania Route 63), which runs northwest–southeast. The main north–south street is Broad Street, which runs southwest–northeast. Pennsylvania Route 363 begins at PA 63 on the western edge of Lansdale and heads southwest on Valley Forge Road. The Lansdale interchange of the Pennsylvania Turnpike Northeast Extension (Interstate 476) is located to the west of the borough in Towamencin Township and connects to PA 63.

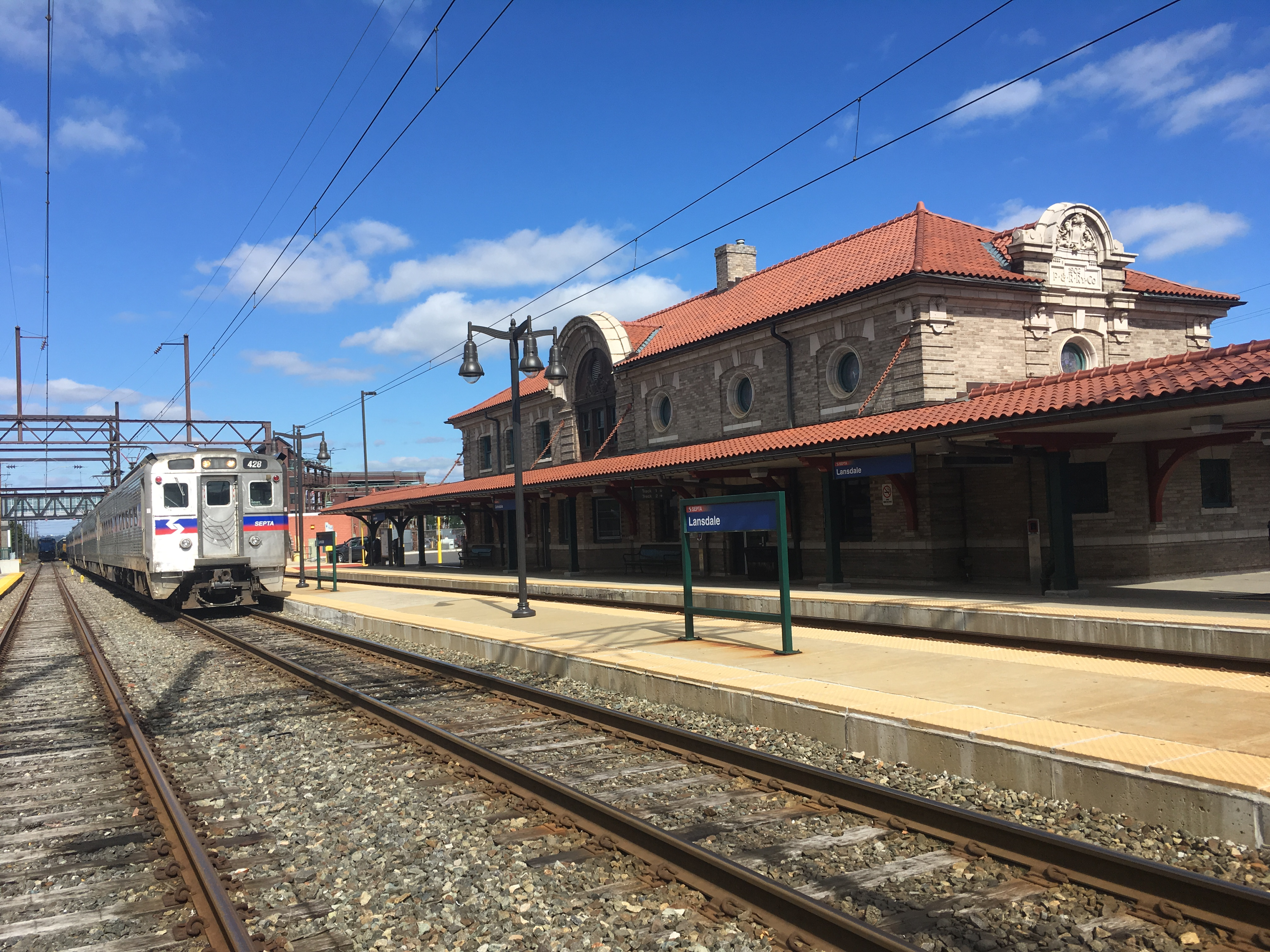
Lansdale station on SEPTA's Lansdale/Doylestown Line

Lansdale is served by SEPTA Regional Rail's Lansdale/Doylestown Line via Lansdale station in downtown, the Pennbrook station in the southern part of the borough, and the 9th Street station in the northern part of the borough, with service to Center City Philadelphia and Doylestown along with intermediate points. Three SEPTA Suburban Division bus routes serve Lansdale: the Route 94 connects the southern part of Lansdale with the Montgomery Mall and Chestnut Hill, the Route 96 connects Lansdale with the Norristown Transportation Center in Norristown, and the Route 132 connects the borough with the Montgomery Mall and Telford.

Lansdale is the headquarters of the Pennsylvania Northeastern Railroad, a short-line freight railroad. The Pennsylvania Northeastern Railroad operates the Lansdale Yard in the borough and provides freight rail service out of Lansdale to several points in the northern suburbs of Philadelphia on SEPTA-owned lines. The railroad interchanges with CSX Transportation in Lansdale.

=== Utilities ===
Lansdale Electric, owned by the borough, provides electricity to most of Lansdale, with portions of the borough receiving electricity from PECO Energy Company, a subsidiary of Exelon. The borough's electric department purchases its electricity from American Municipal Power. Natural gas in Lansdale is provided by PECO Energy Company. The North Penn Water Authority provides water to Lansdale and some surrounding areas. Sewer service in Lansdale is provided by the borough, which operates a wastewater treatment facility. Trash and recycling collection in Lansdale is provided by contracts with private haulers, although the borough has plans for a single hauler serving all residents.

=== Health care ===
Jefferson Health–Abington operates Jefferson Lansdale Hospital, which serves Lansdale and surrounding areas in the North Penn Valley. Jefferson Lansdale Hospital has 140 beds and over 700 employees, including over 300 physicians. Services offered at the hospital include an emergency room, Orthopedic and Spine Institute, Pain Center, Sleep Center, and Wound Care Center. The hospital, which was previously known as North Penn Hospital and later as Central Montgomery Medical Center, was acquired by Abington Memorial Hospital from Universal Health Services in October 2008, with the name changed from Central Montgomery Medical Center to its present name.

== Notable people ==
- Bill MazeroskiThe Hall of Fame Pittsburgh Pirates second baseman relocated to Lansdale in 2019 to be closer to his family, and he passed away there on February 20, 2026.
- Kenneth Kraus (1956– ), former United States Marine who was first American taken hostage by Iranian militants prior to the Iran hostage crisis on Feb. 14, 1979 at the United States Embassy in Tehran. He was handed back over to the United States at the embassy on Feb. 21, 1979, a day after he stood trial in an Iranian kangaroo court, and a day before his death sentence was to be carried out.
- Lois Gunden (1915–2005), recipient of the title Righteous Among the Nations by Yad Vashem for her efforts to care for and protect Jewish children and child refugees of the Spanish Civil War during World War II. Gunden lived with her husband Ernest Clemens in Lansdale from 1958 until her death in 2005.
- Ralph F. Hirschmann (1922–2009), biochemist who led synthesis of the first enzyme.
- Margaret Battavio (Little Peggy March) (born 1948), American pop singer. Her song "I Will Follow Him" was number one in April 1963.
- Russell Hoban (1925–2011), expatriate writer, author of Riddley Walker and the Frances the Badger children's books, was born and grew up in Lansdale.
- Jennifer Strong (c. 1973/1974 – 2011), soccer player.
- Liza Weil (born 1977), actress known for her portrayal of Bonnie Winterbottom in the television series How to Get Away with Murder and for her portrayal of Paris Geller in Gilmore Girls; was born in Passaic, New Jersey but her family has resided in the borough since 1984; Weil is a 1995 alumnus of North Penn High School.
- Ralph James Wickel (1921–2001), Lansdale High School alum served in WWII, awarded tennis scholarship at Temple University, competed in regional and national tennis tournaments. Selected for Junior Davis Cup competition and participated in the US Championships in the early 1950s.
- Paul Bateson (born 1940), radiological technician seen playing one in The Exorcist, later convicted of murdering a film critic and suspected in a series of murders of gay men in late '70s New York.
- Joe Judge (born 1981), former head coach of the New York Giants attended high school in Lansdale.
- Joe Matt (1963–2023), cartoonist, best known for his autobiographical comic, Peepshow.
- John Oates, musician, attended high school in Lansdale.
- Dan Campbell (born 1986) musician, known for being a member of The Wonder Years
- Mandy Mango, nurse and drag queen, was raised in Lansdale.

== In popular culture ==
An episode of the Fox television series Fringe, which aired on September 24, 2009, was set in Lansdale. The scenes that took place in Lansdale were filmed in British Columbia, and the town was depicted as a rural area consisting primarily of corn fields and not as the densely populated suburban town that it actually is.

The beginning of the House season 7 episode "Changes" (May 2, 2011) was set in Lansdale.
