= Jenkins Homestead =

Historic house in Pennsylvania, United States

- U.S. National Register of Historic Places
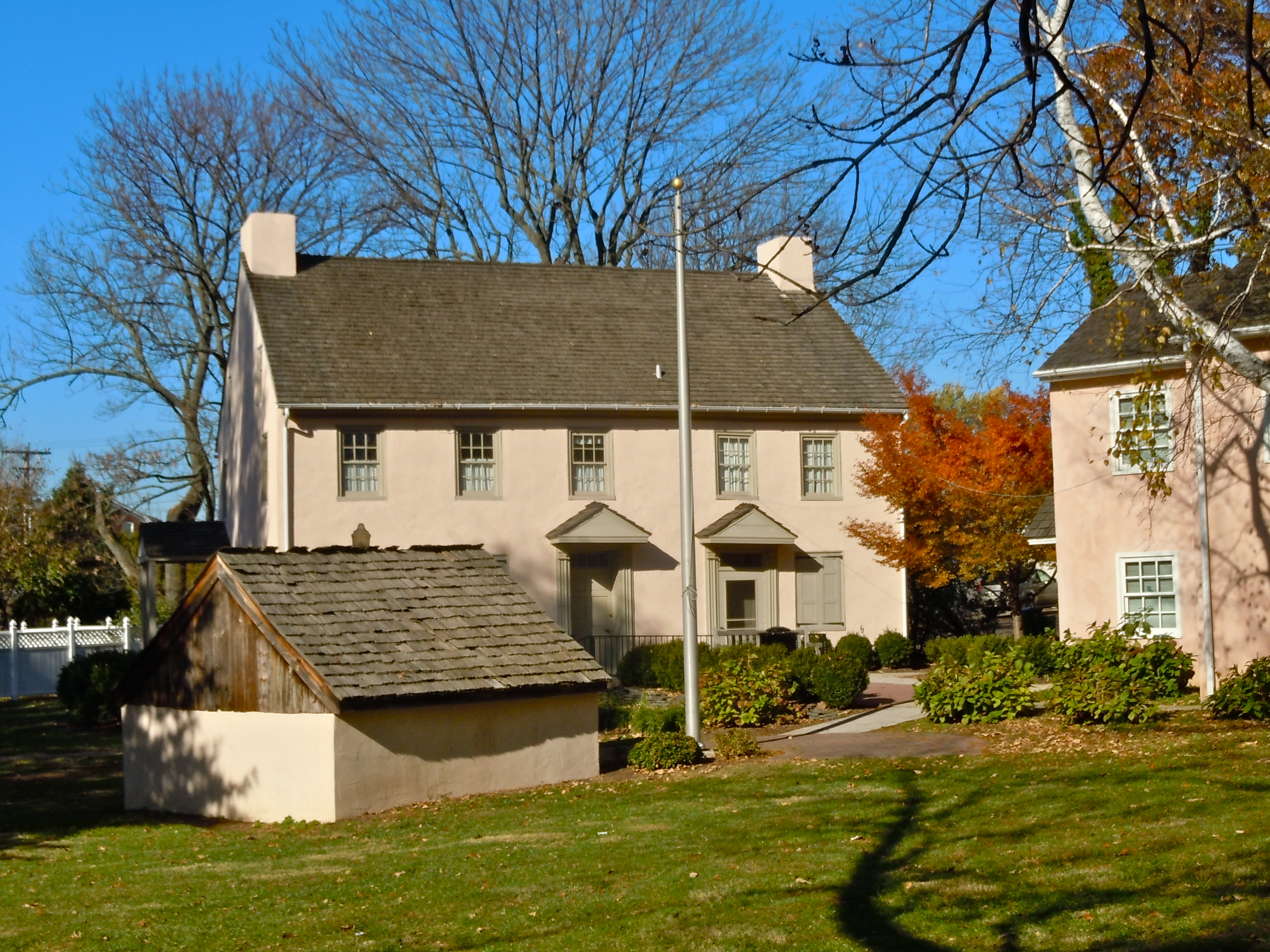
- Jenkin Homestead, November 2011

- Location within Pennsylvania Location within the United States
- Location: 137 Jenkins Ave., Lansdale, Pennsylvania
- Coordinates: 40°14′17″N 75°16′56″W
- Area: 0.3 acres (0.12 ha)
- Built: c. 1805
- Architectural style: English vernacular farmstead
- NRHP reference No.: 77001176
- Added to NRHP: September 15, 1977

Jenkins Homestead is a historic home located at Lansdale, Montgomery County, Pennsylvania. It was built about 1805, and is a 2 1/2-story, five-bay, stucco over stone dwelling. It has two front entryways, one entering onto a through central hallway. It is the oldest structure in Lansdale.

It was added to the National Register of Historic Places in 1977.
