= Calvary Baptist School (Pennsylvania) =

American Christian private school in Lansdale

Coordinates: 40.23131°N 75.31269°W

Calvary Baptist School is a private K-12 Baptist Christian school in Lansdale, Pennsylvania.

== Background ==
Calvary Baptist School was established in September 1968 when school leaders began offering classes for students in kindergarten and grades one through six. The total combined enrollment of the student body that year was 118. Over the years, classes were expanded to include students in upper grades so that, by 1973, Calvary Baptist provided education through grade twelve. That same year, the school held graduation ceremonies for its first class of seniors.

In 2005, school administrators also established a preschool program. Initial enrollment at the Foundations Christian Preschool included 21 preschool and kindergarten students, and recently reached a high of 125 students with total enrollment for 2018 from preschool through grade twelve reaching more than 460.

In 2015, the school was listed among the 100 Best Private High Schools in Pennsylvania.

The current head of school is Robbie May.
