= The Reporter (Lansdale) =

Newspaper published in Lansdale, Pennsylvania

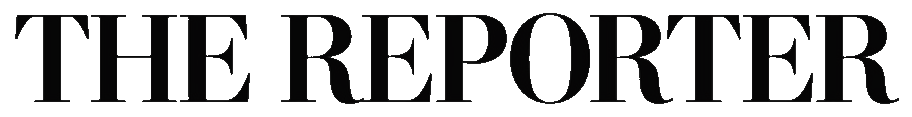
- Type: Daily newspaper
- Format: Broadsheet
- Owner(s): Journal Register Company
- Publisher: Dena Fritz
- Founded: October 27, 1870; 154 years ago (as the Lansdale Reporter)
- Headquarters: 307 Derstine Ave. Lansdale, PA 19446; United States
- Price: 75 cents weekdays, $1.50 Sunday
- Website: thereporteronline.com

The Reporter is the local newspaper based out of Lansdale, Pennsylvania owned by Journal Register Company. It primarily serves the communities in the North Penn Valley and the Souderton Area School District, including Lansdale Borough, Montgomery Township, Hatfield Township, Hatfield Borough, North Wales Borough, Towamencin Township, Skippack Township, Souderton Borough, Telford Borough, and other municipalities in northwest suburban Montgomery County in southeast Pennsylvania.

The Reporter traces its founding to October 27, 1870 when the Lansdale Reporter was a weekly four-page advertising missive. Its founder was Frederick Wagner.

The early Lansdale Reporter focused on close-knit community news, with articles discussing trivial news ranging from Miss Grendle's visit to the Bauer Family on a Friday to John Smith making the crowd laugh at his birthday bash. By 1915, the paper was a bona fide information tool. "Even after Lansdale became a borough in 1872, The Reporter didn't cover council meetings right away", Lansdale Historical Society President Dick Shearer said. "The Reporter was primarily a print shop device."

By 1918, the region at three newspapers: The Lansdale Reporter, The Republican and The North Penn Review. The Review was bought out by The Republican and became the Republican-Review.

In 1923, Walter Sanborn, the owner of the Lansdale Reporter sold the newspaper to Republican-Review publisher Chester Knipe, who merged it with his paper.

The Republican-Review-Reporter was shortened to The Reporter-Review. In 1927, Sanborn bought the paper back from Knipe and renamed it The North Penn Reporter.

Prior to the merger on August 17, 1922, an edition called The North Penn Review featured Lansdale's 50th anniversary on its front page.

The paper celebrated its 100th anniversary on November 1, 1970. At this time subscription rates were $17 for one year.

In 1980 The Reporter was sold to Gannett Corporation, which also used the presses as a print site for USA Today in the Philadelphia region. In 2001 Gannett sold The Reporter to Journal Register Company, currently based in Yardley, Pennsylvania.

As of August 2009, Journal Register Company also owns 18 other daily newspapers, 152 non-daily publications and 128 web sites affiliated with print publications, in five geographic locations of the United States, in the east and midwest.

In May 2008, Journal Register Company was delisted from the New York Stock Exchange due to low share prices.
