= Kenneth Kraus =

United States Marine

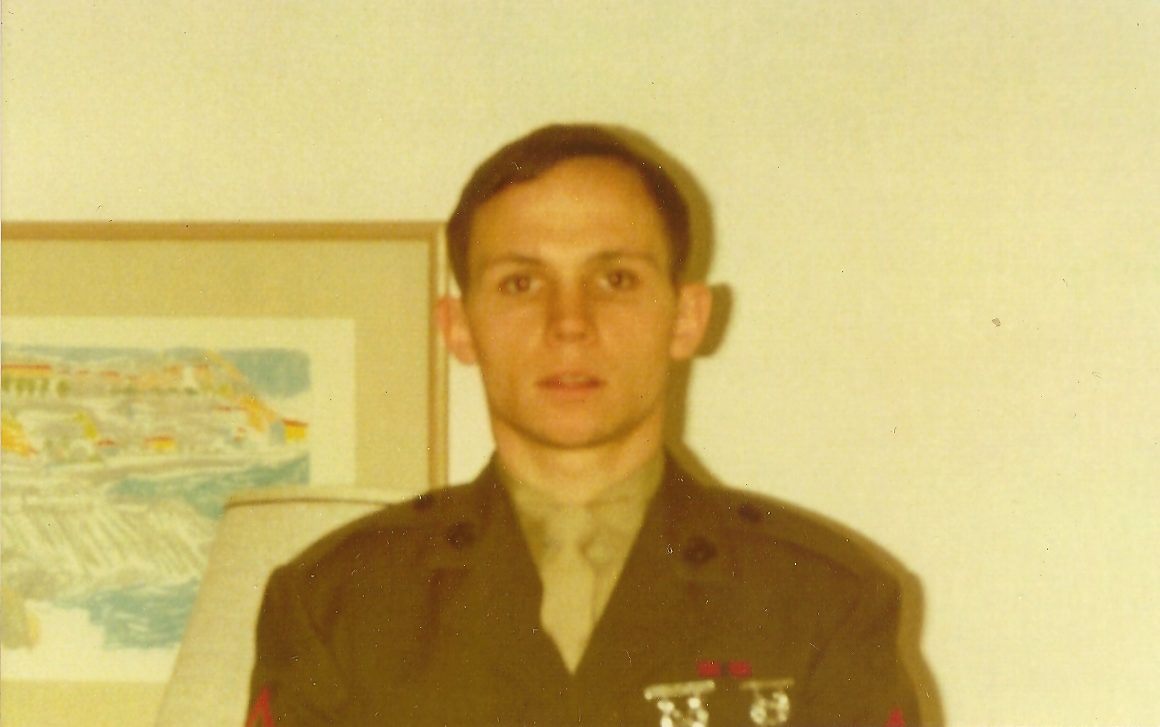
- Born: September 27, 1956 (age 69); Lansdale, Pennsylvania, U.S.
- Occupations: U.S. Marine, United States Marine Corps (1975–1986); Detective, Roswell, Georgia Police (1995–2016)
- Known for: Being the first United States hostage of Iranian militants prior to the Iran hostage crisis

Kenneth L. Kraus is a former United States Marine who was the first American taken hostage by Iranian militants prior to the Iran hostage crisis.

== Early life ==
Kraus grew up in Pennsylvania. He joined the Marines in 1975 as an air traffic controller. He re-enlisted and moved to embassy duty; his first embassy assignment was in Cyprus.

== Experience ==
On February 14, 1979, at approximately 9:45 am in Tehran, the United States Embassy in Tehran was attacked and held by Fadaiyan-e-Khalq militants in what became known as the Valentine's Day Open House. One Marine, Kraus, was shot and injured, then kidnapped. He spent a week in detention, where he was tortured for sensitive information on the embassy. He was accused of shooting Iranian civilians and stood trial in what he referred to as a Kangaroo court. He was sentenced to death. Within a week, United States President Jimmy Carter and Ambassador William Sullivan secured his release, and he returned to a hero's welcome, and was awarded the Purple Heart and Navy Commendation Medal, which honors acts of heroism.

== Capture ==
At 22 years old Kraus was sent to Tehran. Then, in February 1979, the Iranian Revolution began and the Shah was overthrown. That was when the embassy came under attack for the first time.

The compound was overrun at 10:30 am. The 19 Marine guards were armed only with pistols and shotguns. Embassy staff locked themselves in the communications vault and started to destroy documents. Fedayeen militants threatened to set fire to the place and kill them all, so Ambassador Sullivan ordered the surrender of the embassy.

By that time Kraus and two other Marines were in the embassy cafeteria with more than 18 civilians. One of the militants approached the building and Kraus caught him by surprise and pointed a shotgun at his head. He and his fellow Marines negotiated to let the civilians go peacefully. The Marines then destroyed most of the weapons to keep them from falling into the hands of the militants. Militants then stormed the restaurant and captured the marines. One of them fired a shotgun at Kraus, but his body armor absorbed the brunt of the impact. He was hit in his head and chest with shrapnel, but not severely. He was then beaten for information. When he did not give anything to his captors, one of them pulled a gun and fired it in close proximity, intentionally not to kill, but to wound him further; he was bleeding from his neck, arms and chest.

Within hours he awoke in a hospital and was then blindfolded and taken to the Islamic Revolutionary Prison. He was interrogated and tortured, then on February 20, 1979, he stood trial in what was a ten-minute process; he was convicted of murder and sentenced to death, to be carried out on February 22, 1979.

== Release and return ==
With the help of Iranian Foreign Minister Ebrahim Yazdi, the siege was ended within three hours, but Kraus' whereabouts were claimed to be unknown. It took less than a week to arrange his release.

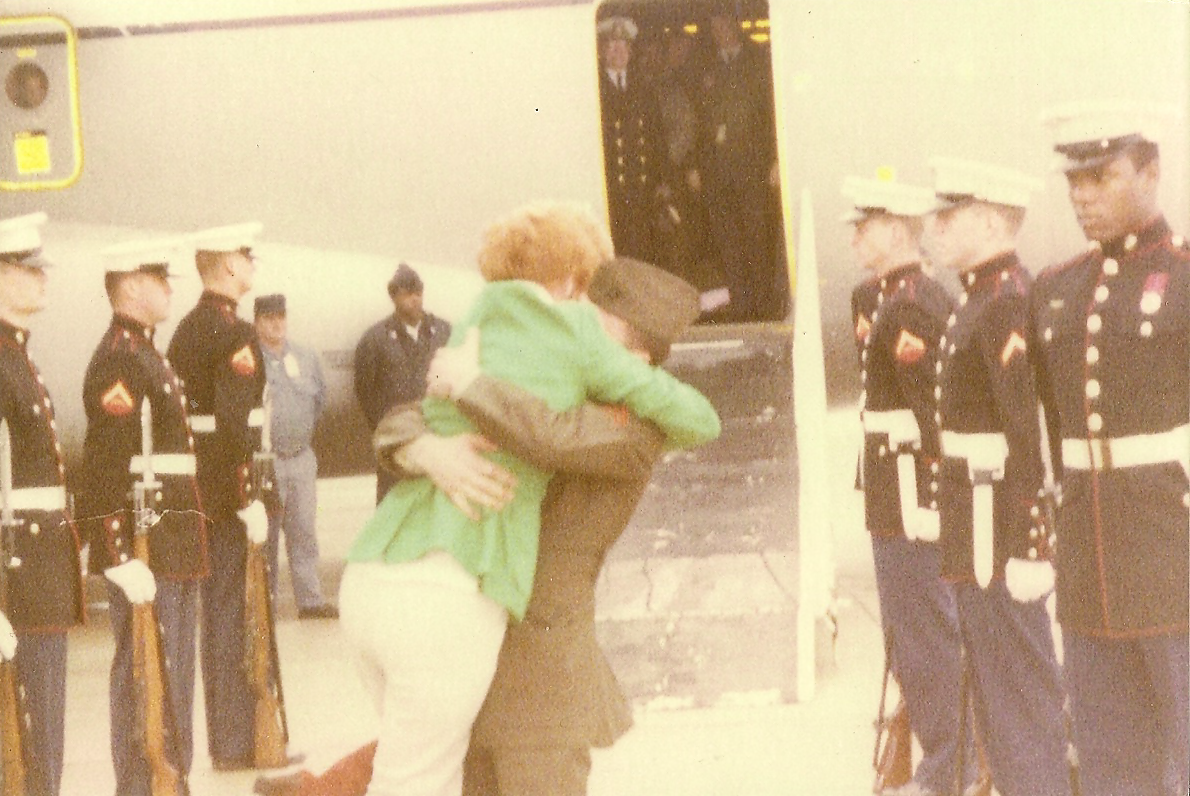
Kenneth Kraus and his mother as he deplaned at Andrews Air Force Base

On February 21, Kraus was handed back over to the United States at the embassy, then flown to Washington, D.C., via Ramstein Air Base in Germany.

== Awards and commendation ==
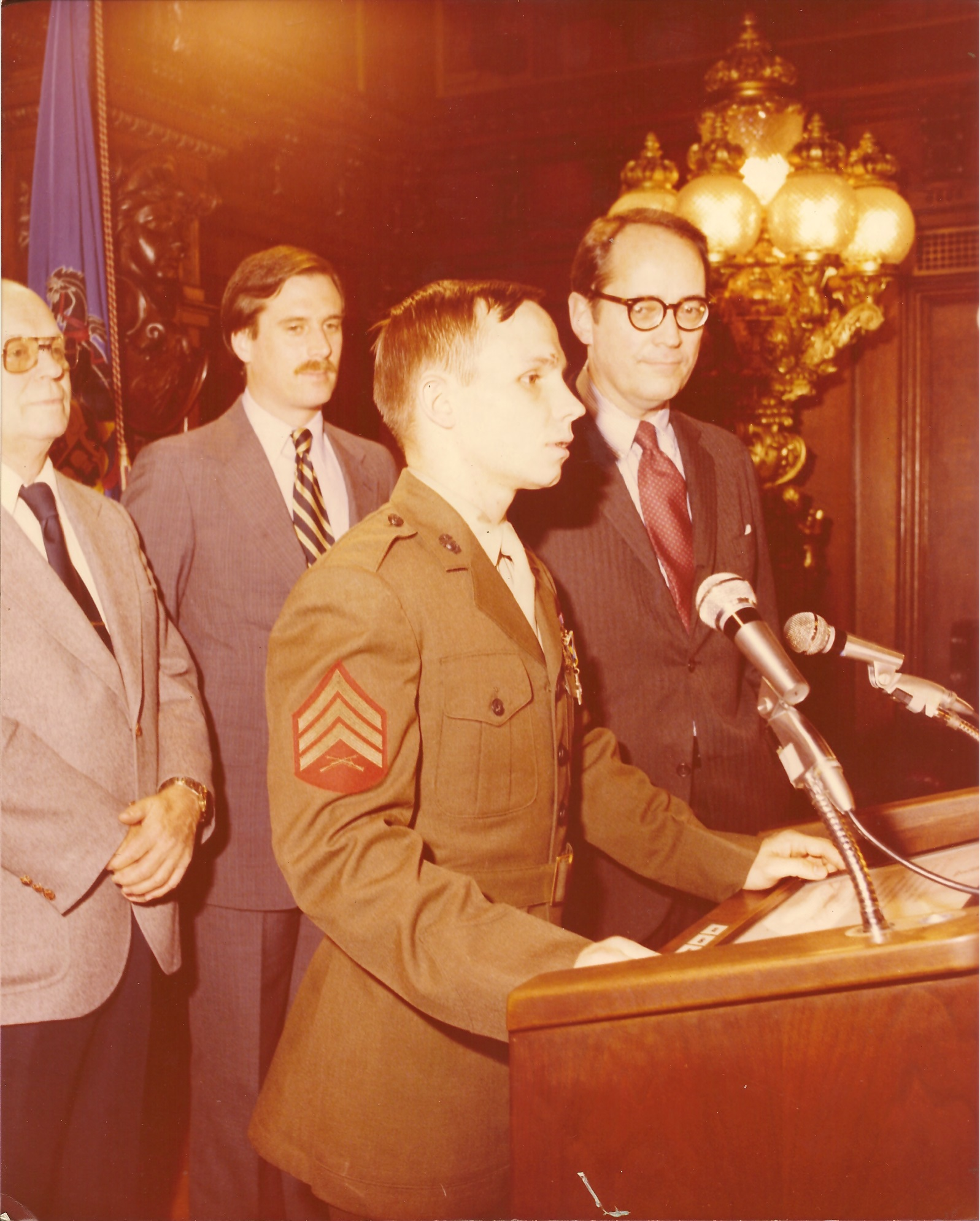
Kenneth Kraus being given the Cross of Valor with Governor Dick Thornburgh in 1979

He was awarded the Purple Heart and the Navy Commendation Medal.

== Lawsuit ==
Kraus filed a $60 million lawsuit against the Iranian Government on February 11, 1980.

== See also ==
- List of kidnappings
- List of solved missing person cases

== Post-military career ==
- Special nuclear materials security specialist for the U.S. Dept of Energy (1986–1992).
- Graduate of the National Forensic Academy at the University of Tennessee (1992–1995).
- Crime scene investigator and police detective in the Roswell, Georgia, police department (1995–2016).

== Notes ==
- Photographs of Kraus 1, 2
- More photographs on Wiki Commons
