= Scott D. Sullivan =

American fraudster

Scott D. Sullivan is the former chief financial officer (CFO), secretary, treasurer, and a board member of WorldCom, who was convicted as part of WorldCom's $11 billion accounting fraud, at the time the largest scandal of its kind in U.S. history.

== Biography ==
Sullivan attended Bethlehem Central High School in Delmar, New York. He graduated from the State University of New York at Oswego in 1983, and was awarded the Anniversary Class Award for alumni in 1998.

Sullivan was CFO, treasurer and secretary of WorldCom from December 1994 to December 2002, and was its executive vice president from April 2002. During this time, he put on ostentatious displays of wealth, including building a 24,000 sq ft (2,200 m^{2}) mansion in Boca Raton, Florida.

In 2002, WorldCom learned of improper accounting at the company. Sullivan was asked to resign by the company's board of directors; he refused, and was fired. In August of that year, Sullivan was arrested and charged with seven counts related to fraud at WorldCom.

Sullivan entered a guilty plea and was sentenced to five years in prison as part of a plea agreement in which Sullivan testified against former WorldCom CEO Bernard Ebbers, who received a 25-year sentence (the maximum sentence that Sullivan could have received if he had not accepted the plea agreement and was found guilty).

Sullivan was released from jail in August 2009, after serving four years of his sentence. He was required to be on home confinement for another three years. He returned to Boca Raton, but not to his mansion, which had been sold.
