= O.P.M. Leasing Services =

O.P.M. Leasing Services, Inc. was a computer leasing company that was involved in one of the biggest corporate scandals at the time it filed bankruptcy in 1981, with fraud of over $200 million.

O.P.M. Leasing Services (OPM stood for Other People's Money) was started in 1970 in Brooklyn by Mordecai Weissman and Myron Goodman. It later moved its headquarters to Manhattan. It grew to be one of the five largest computer leasing companies in the country.

O.P.M. Leasing Services borrowed money to purchase computers that it then leased to corporate customers. The computers and the assignment of the lease, in turn, were used as collateral for the loan. Lease payments were used to service the loan. Lenders included banks, thrifts, insurance companies, and pension funds. Customers who leased the computers included Merrill Lynch, Xerox, American Express, and General Motors, with Rockwell International being the largest. The company expanded rapidly because it offered more generous lease terms to its customers than did its competitors.

The fraud started in 1972 when the company began forging and altering leases, using the same lease as collateral for multiple loans, creating fictitious leases for computers that did not exist, and inflating the value of the lease payments.

The downfall came in February 1981, when it was discovered that a signature on one of the Rockwell International leases was forged. The company filed for bankruptcy the following month. Goodman was sentenced to 12 years in prison and Weissman to 10 years; five other employees were also sent to prison. (Goodman and Weissman had also purchased control of the First National Bank of Jefferson Parish in Louisiana in 1978, which they used to kite checks for O.P.M. In March 1980, O.P.M. Services pleaded guilty in the check-kiting scheme and was fined $110,000.)

The bankruptcy trustee wrote a report on the fraud, criticizing its auditor (Fox & Company), its investment banker (Lehman Brothers Kuhn Loeb), its law firm (Singer Hutner Levine & Seeman) and Rockwell International. It indicated gross negligence among many of the outside parties and that some of them were aware of the fraud but did not report it, or sometimes abetted it.
