= Frank Dunn =

Canadian businessman (born 1954)

- Born: 27 January 1954 (age 72); Montreal, Quebec
- Education: McGill University (BComm '76)
- Spouse: Nancy Donna Kosorwich (m. 1976)

Frank Andrew Dunn (born 27 January 1954) is a Canadian business executive who was the chief executive officer of Nortel Networks. Dunn joined Nortel Networks (when it was still known as Northern Electric) as a management trainee in 1976, after graduating from McGill University. He worked his way up through the company and was appointed CFO in 1999 under CEO John Roth. After Roth retired, the Board of Directors appointed Dunn CEO in November 2001.

In 2007, the U.S. Securities and Exchange Commission filed civil fraud charges against him, and three former senior executives, in a wide-ranging financial fraud scheme. The SEC said that at least a year's worth of the alleged misconduct took place while John Roth was still CEO of Nortel, though no charges were laid against him. Roth left the company with an estimated $139 million in salary and stock options.

On June 19, 2008, Dunn (then aged 54) was arrested by the Royal Canadian Mounted Police, along with two other former Nortel executives, charged with fraud affecting the public market, falsification of books and documents and producing a false prospectus.[5].

On January 14, 2013, Ontario Superior Court Justice Frank Marrocco dismissed fraud charges against former Nortel chief executive Frank Dunn, former chief financial officer Douglas Beatty and ex-controller Michael Gollogly, saying the Crown had failed to meet "the high standard of proof" in a criminal case. "I am not satisfied beyond a reasonable doubt that Frank A. Dunn, Douglas C. Beatty and Michael J. Gollogly deliberately misrepresented the financial results of Nortel Networks Corporation," Justice Marrocco said in his ruling. This came four years to the day after Nortel sought bankruptcy protection and began liquidating.

On December 19, 2014, remaining civil charges from the OSC and SEC were simultaneously dropped against Dunn and several of his former colleagues. Ultimately, no civil or criminal charges were successfully brought against Dunn or any others individuals connected to the Nortel accounting scandal.

Business positions
Preceded by John Roth	CEO of Nortel Networks; 2001–2004	Succeeded by William Owens (Admiral)
