= Bernard Ebbers =

Canadian-American businessman and fraudster (1941–2020)

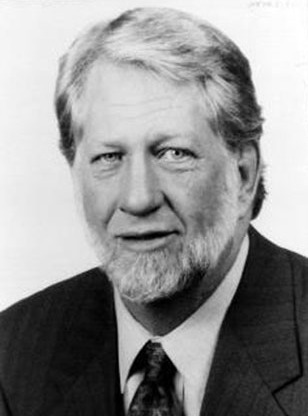
- Ebbers c. 2000
- Born: Bernard John Ebbers; August 27, 1941; Edmonton, Alberta, Canada
- Died: February 2, 2020 (aged 78); Brookhaven, Mississippi, U.S.
- Education: Mississippi College
- Spouses: Linda Pigott (m. 1968; div. 1997) Kristie Webb (m. 1999; div. 2008)
- Status: Deceased
- Criminal charges: Securities fraud, conspiracy
- Penalty: 25-year imprisonment

Details
- Imprisoned at: Federal Correctional Institution, Fort Worth

Bernard John Ebbers (August 27, 1941 – February 2, 2020) was a Canadian-American businessman and the co-founder and chief executive officer (CEO) of WorldCom. Under his management, WorldCom grew rapidly but collapsed in 2002 amid revelations of accounting irregularities, making it at the time one of the largest accounting scandals in the United States. Ebbers blamed his subordinates but was convicted of fraud and conspiracy. In December 2019, Ebbers was released from the Fort Worth Federal Medical Center due to declining health, having served 13 years of his 25-year sentence, and he died just over a month later.

In 2009, Condé Nast Portfolio and Time named Ebbers among the worst CEOs in business history.

Dubbed the "Telecom Cowboy," Ebbers often wore boots and blue jeans instead of the typical corporate uniform of a suit and tie. He also lived on a farm and loved to drive a tractor.

== Early life and education ==
Ebbers was born in Edmonton, Alberta, the second of five children of Kathleen and John Ebbers, a traveling salesman. His family were devout Christians.

When Ebbers was young, the family moved to California and later lived for a while on a mission post on a Navajo Nation Indian reservation in New Mexico before moving back to Canada when Ebbers was a teenager.

After high school, Ebbers briefly attended the University of Alberta and Calvin College before enrolling at Mississippi College on a basketball scholarship. Between schools, he worked as a milkman and bouncer. An injury before his senior season prevented him from playing his final year and he was instead assigned to coach the junior varsity team. In 1967, he received a Bachelor's degree in physical education, with an academic minor in secondary education, from Mississippi College.

== Career ==
Ebbers began his business career operating a chain of motels in Mississippi.

In 1983, following a meeting at a coffee shop in Hattiesburg, Mississippi, Murray Waldron wrote a business plan for selling low-cost, long-distance phone service on a napkin. Ebbers and a group of investors raised $650,000 to form Long Distance Discount Services, Inc. In 1985, he was named CEO. The company acquired over 60 telecommunications firms and in 1995, it changed its name to WorldCom.

In 1996, WorldCom acquired MFS Communications (originally Metropolitan Fiber Systems) and in July 1998, it acquired MCI Communications. In July 2000, it abandoned its planned $115 billion acquisition of Sprint Corporation after U.S. and European Union antitrust regulators raised objections.

Between September 2000 and April 2002, the board of directors of Worldcom authorized several loans and loan guarantees to Ebbers so that he would not have to sell his Worldcom shares to meet margin calls as the share price plummeted during the bursting of the dot-com bubble. By April 2002, Ebbers had lost substantial support on the board due to these loans. Additionally, a number of directors believed Ebbers had not charted a way forward after the Sprint merger collapsed. On April 26, Worldcom's board voted unanimously to demand that Ebbers resign, which he formally did on April 30, 2002. As part of his departure, his loans were consolidated into a single $408.2 million promissory note. In 2003, Ebbers defaulted on the note and Worldcom foreclosed on many of his assets.

=== Awards and accolades ===
- Mississippi Business Hall of Fame (May 1995)
- Member of Wired 25 (November 1998)
- 25 most powerful people in networking by Network World (January 4, 1999)
- Time Digital 50 (1999)
- Honorary Doctor of Laws, Mississippi College (1992)
- Honorary doctorate, Tougaloo College (1998)

== Fraud ==
On June 25, 2002, WorldCom admitted to nearly $3.9 billion in accounting misstatements and on July 22, 2002, it filed for bankruptcy.

The figure eventually grew to $11 billion. This initiated a series of investigations and legal proceedings, which focused on Ebbers, WorldCom's former CEO.

Ebbers blamed the accounting scandal on his subordinates, including WorldCom CFO Scott Sullivan.

=== Congressional hearing ===
In response to a subpoena, Ebbers appeared before the U.S. House Committee on Financial Services on July 8, 2002. At these hearings, Ebbers stated "I do not believe I have anything to hide, I believe that no one will conclude that I engaged in any criminal or fraudulent conduct."

After making this statement, Ebbers asserted his right against self-incrimination per the Fifth Amendment to the United States Constitution. Ebbers's statement constituted testimony that could not undergo cross-examination, and Ebbers was threatened with charges of contempt of Congress, although no charges were filed.

=== Criminal charges and verdict ===
On August 27, 2003, Oklahoma Attorney General Drew Edmondson filed a 15-count indictment against Ebbers. The indictment charged that he violated securities laws by defrauding investors on multiple occasions between January 2001 and March 2002. On November 20, 2003, the charges by Oklahoma were dropped, with the right to refile retained, to defer to federal charges.

On March 2, 2004, federal authorities indicted Ebbers on securities fraud and conspiracy charges. On May 25, 2004, federal prosecutors increased the list of charges to 9 felonies: 1 count each of conspiracy and securities fraud, and 7 counts of filing false statements with securities regulators. On March 15, 2005, Ebbers was found guilty of all charges. On March 30, 2005, an agreement to extend the statute of limitations on the charges from Oklahoma was signed, allowing Oklahoma prosecutors time to see the results of federal sentencing.

=== Sentencing and jail time ===
On July 13, 2005, federal judge Barbara S. Jones, of the United States District Court for the Southern District of New York, sentenced Ebbers to 25 years in a federal prison in Louisiana. Ebbers was allowed to remain free for another year while his appeal was being considered. His conviction was upheld in the U.S. Court of Appeals for the Second Circuit in July 2006. On September 6, 2006, the presiding judge ordered him to report to jail on September 26 to start serving his 25-year sentence. Ebbers reported to Oakdale Federal Correctional Institution in Oakdale, Louisiana, on September 26, 2006, driving himself to the prison in his Mercedes-Benz vehicle. Ebbers served in the low-security portion of the complex, which typically houses non-violent offenders and is built like a school dormitory. Shortly before his death, he was granted early release after serving 13 years in December 2019, due to health problems.

=== Civil suits ===
On October 11, 2002, WorldCom investors brought a class action civil lawsuit against Ebbers and other defendants, alleging injuries as a result of Ebbers's securities fraud violations. Judge Denise Cote of the United States District Court for the Southern District of New York ordered the parties in the lawsuit to negotiate. The parties agreed that Ebbers and his codefendants would distribute over $6.13 billion, plus interest, to over 830,000 individuals and institutions that had held stocks and bonds in WorldCom at the time of its collapse. Ebbers agreed to relinquish almost all of his assets, including a home in Mississippi, and his interests in a lumber company, a marina, a golf course, a hotel, and thousands of acres of forested real estate. After the settlement, Ebbers's wife was left with an estimated $50,000 in known assets. On September 21, 2005, Judge Cote approved the settlement and dismissed the lawsuit against Ebbers.

== Personal life ==
=== Marriages ===
In 1968, Ebbers married Linda Pigott and the couple raised three daughters. Ebbers filed for divorce in July 1997 and married his second wife, Kristie Webb, in the spring of 1999. She filed for divorce on April 16, 2008, approximately a year and half after he entered prison.

=== Personal holdings ===
At his peak in early 1999, Ebbers was worth an estimated $1.4 billion and listed as 174th on the Forbes 400. His personal holdings included:

- Douglas Lake Canada's biggest ranch – 500,000 acres (2,000 km^{2}) in British Columbia. General partner/president. Acquired in 1998 for about $65 million. Sold on May 30, 2003, by MCI to E. Stanley Kroenke.
- Angelina Plantation – 21,000 acres (85 km^{2}) farm in Monterey, Louisiana. Co-owner with brother, John Ebbers. Acquired in 1998.
- Joshua Holdings – which combined with Joshua Timberlands and Joshua Timber totals 540,000 acres (2,200 km^{2}) of timberlands in Mississippi, Tennessee, Louisiana, and Alabama. Majority owner. Acquired properties in 1999 for about $600 million.
- Pine Ridge Farm – Livestock and crop farm in Mississippi. Owner. LLC formed in 1997.
- Columbus Lumber – High-tech lumber mill in Brookhaven, Mississippi. Majority owner since at least 1996.
- Yachts – BCT Holdings, owner of Intermarine, a yacht building and repair company in Georgia. Primary owner. Intermarine acquired in 1998 for about $14 million.
- Hotels – Nine hotels in Mississippi and Tennessee: Co-owner or owner. Acquired over many years.
- Trucking – KLLM, a trucking firm in Mississippi. Director. Acquired with partner in 2000 for about $30 million. Was at one point led by K. William Grothe, who was an executive at WorldCom.
- Sports – Mississippi Indoor Sports/Jackson Bandits, a minor league hockey team. 50% owner. Acquired in 1999. Sold stake in September 2003.

=== Other activities ===
From 1993 through 1995, Ebbers served as chairman of the board of directors of the Competitive Telecommunications Association, where he pleaded with the United States Congress to improve competition with the incumbent telecommunications companies.

In 1997, he became the chair for Mississippi College's New Dawn Campaign, a $100 million fundraising campaign to improve campus facilities.

In July 2001, Ebbers was proposed by George W. Bush as the chair for the President's National Security Telecommunications Advisory Committee.

=== Religious faith ===
While CEO of WorldCom, Ebbers was a member of the Easthaven Baptist Church in Brookhaven, Mississippi. As a high-profile member of the congregation, Ebbers regularly taught Sunday school and attended the morning church service with his family. His faith was overt, and he often started corporate meetings with prayer.

When the allegations of conspiracy and fraud were first brought to light in 2002, Ebbers addressed the congregation and insisted on his innocence. "I just want you to know you aren't going to church with a crook," he said. "No one will find me to have knowingly committed fraud."

=== Death ===
Ebbers died at his home in Brookhaven, Mississippi, on February 2, 2020, at the age of 78, just over a month after being granted compassionate release from prison due to his ill health. His lawyers said that he was, by the time of his death, legally blind and suffering from dementia, anemia and significant weight loss.
