= WorldCom =

American telecommunications company (1983–2006)

MCI Inc.
- Trade name: Verizon Enterprise Solutions; Verizon Business
- Formerly: Long Distance Discount Services (1983–1995); WorldCom (1995–1998, 2000–2003); MCI WorldCom (1998–2000); MCI (2003–2006)
- Type: Public
- Traded as: Nasdaq: MCIP; OTC Pink: WCOEQ; Nasdaq: WCOEQ; Nasdaq: WCOME; Nasdaq: WCOM
- Industry: Telecommunications
- Founded: 1983; 43 years ago in Hattiesburg, Mississippi, U.S.
- Founder: Bernard Ebbers
- Defunct: January 2006; 20 years ago
- Fate: Acquired by Verizon Communications
- Headquarters: Ashburn, Virginia, U.S.
- Products: Conferencing, contact centers, data and IP services, internet access, IT solutions and hosting, managed networks, premises equipment (CPE), security, voice, VoIP, Wireless
- Revenue: US$20.6 billion (2005)
- Parent: Verizon Communications (2006)
- Website: enterprise.verizon.com; www.mci.com/mcihome.jsp

MCI, Inc. (formerly WorldCom and MCI WorldCom) was a telecommunications company. For a time, it was the second-largest long-distance telephone company in the United States, after AT&T. WorldCom grew largely by acquiring other telecommunications companies, including MCI Communications in 1998, and filed for bankruptcy in July 2002 after an accounting scandal, in which several executives were convicted of a scheme to inflate the company's assets. These include Bernard Ebbers, who was named CEO of the company from 1985 until December 16, 2002, when he retired. WorldCom then emerged from bankruptcy under Michael Capellas, who served as its last chairman and CEO until January 2006, when the company, by then renamed MCI, was acquired by Verizon Communications and was later integrated into Verizon Business.

WorldCom was originally headquartered in Clinton, Mississippi, before moving to Ashburn, Virginia, when it changed its name to MCI.

== History ==
=== Foundation ===
In 1983, in a coffee shop in Hattiesburg, Mississippi, Bernard Ebbers and three other investors formed Long Distance Discount Services, Inc. based in Jackson, Mississippi, and in 1985, Ebbers was named chief executive officer.

The company acquired more than 60 telecommunication firms, and in 1995, it changed its name to WorldCom.

In 1989, it merged with Advantage Companies Inc. In 1995, it was renamed LDDS WorldCom and moved to Clinton, Mississippi.

The company grew rapidly in the 1990s through mergers and acquisitions.

WorldCom's first major acquisition was in 1992. It outbid larger rivals Sprint Corporation and AT&T to secure the $720 million acquisition of Advanced Telecommunications Corporation. The deal made WorldCom a substantially larger player in the telecoms market.

Other acquisitions followed: Metromedia Communication Corp. and Resurgens Communications Group (1993), IDB Communications Group, Inc (1994), Williams Technology Group, Inc. (1995), and MFS Communications Company (1996)—the last of which brought along MFS' newly acquired UUNET Technologies, Inc.

=== MCI acquisition ===
MCI WorldCom logo (1998–2000)

On November 4, 1997, WorldCom and MCI Communications announced a $37 billion merger to form MCI WorldCom, making it the largest corporate merger in U.S. history. MCI divested its "internetMCI" business to gain approval from the United States Department of Justice. On September 15, 1998, the merger was consummated, forming MCI WorldCom.

In February 1998, WorldCom acquired CompuServe from H&R Block. Retaining the CompuServe Network Services Division, WorldCom traded its online service to America Online for AOL's network division, ANS. In June 2001, WorldCom acquired the corporate parent of Digex, Intermedia Communications, and then sold all of Intermedia's non-Digex assets to Allegiance Telecom.

=== Attempted Sprint merger ===
WorldCom logo (2000–2003)

On October 5, 1999, Sprint Corporation and MCI WorldCom announced plans for a $129 billion merger. Had the deal been completed, it would have been the largest corporate merger in history, creating a merged company that would have surpassed AT&T as the largest communications company in the United States. But the U.S. Department of Justice and the European Union were concerned that the deal would create a monopoly. On July 13, 2000, the boards of directors of both companies terminated the merger. Later that year, MCI WorldCom renamed itself back into "WorldCom".

=== Accounting scandals ===
Between September 2000 and April 2002, the board of directors of WorldCom authorized several loans and loan guarantees to CEO Bernard Ebbers so that he would not have to sell his WorldCom shares to meet margin calls as the share price plummeted during the bursting of the dot-com bubble. By April 2002, the board had lost patience with these loans. Directors also believed that Ebbers did not seem to have a coherent strategy after the Sprint merger collapsed. On April 26, the board voted to ask for Ebbers' resignation. Ebbers formally resigned on April 30, 2002 and was replaced by John W. Sidgmore, former CEO of UUNET. As part of his departure, Ebbers's loans were consolidated into a single $408.2 million promissory note. In 2003, Ebbers defaulted on the note and WorldCom foreclosed on many of his assets.

Beginning modestly during mid-1999 and continuing at an accelerated pace through May 2002, Ebbers, CFO Scott Sullivan, controller David Myers and general accounting director Buford "Buddy" Yates used fraudulent accounting methods to disguise WorldCom's decreasing earnings in order to maintain the company's stock price.

The fraud was accomplished primarily in two ways:

1. Booking "line costs" (interconnection expenses with other telecommunication companies) as capital expenditures on the balance sheet instead of expenses.
2. Inflating revenues with bogus accounting entries from "corporate unallocated revenue accounts".

In June 2002, a small team of internal auditors at WorldCom led by division vice president Cynthia Cooper and senior associate Eugene Morse worked together, often at night and secretly, to investigate and reveal what was initially valued as $3.8 billion worth of fraudulent entries in WorldCom's books. The investigation was triggered by suspicious balance sheet entries discovered during a routine capital expenditure audit. Cooper notified the company's audit committee and board of directors in June 2002. The board moved swiftly, forcing Myers to resign and firing Sullivan when he refused to resign. Arthur Andersen withdrew its audit opinion for 2001. Cooper and her team had exposed the largest accounting fraud in American history, displacing the fraud uncovered at Enron less than a year earlier. By the end of 2003, it was estimated that the company's total assets had been fraudulently inflated by about $11 billion, the largest accounting fraud ever uncovered until the exposure of Bernard Madoff's giant Ponzi scheme in 2008.

By this time, the U.S. Attorney for the Southern District of Mississippi, the Federal Bureau of Investigation and the U.S. Securities and Exchange Commission were already looking into the matter as well. The SEC launched a formal inquiry into these matters on June 26, 2002. The SEC was already investigating WorldCom for questionable accounting practices.

The fraud came to light just days after Andersen was convicted of obstruction of justice in the Enron scandal, a verdict that effectively put Andersen out of business. In his post-mortem of the Enron scandal, Conspiracy of Fools, journalist Kurt Eichenwald argued that Andersen's failure to uncover WorldCom's deceit would have brought Andersen down even if it had escaped the Enron fraud unscathed.

=== Bankruptcy ===
On July 21, 2002, WorldCom filed for Chapter 11 bankruptcy protection in the largest such filing in United States history at the time. (It would be overtaken in September 2008 by the bankruptcies of Lehman Brothers and Washington Mutual in a span of 11 days.) The WorldCom bankruptcy proceedings were held before U.S. Federal Bankruptcy Judge Arthur Gonzalez, who simultaneously heard the Enron bankruptcy proceedings, which were the second-largest bankruptcy case resulting from one of the largest corporate fraud scandals. None of the criminal proceedings against WorldCom and its officers and agents were originated by referral from Gonzalez or the Department of Justice lawyers. By the bankruptcy reorganization agreement, the company paid $750 million to the SEC in cash and stock in the new MCI, which was intended to be paid to wronged investors.

Effective December 16, 2002, Michael Capellas became chairman and chief executive officer. On April 14, 2003, WorldCom changed its name to MCI, and relocated its corporate headquarters from Clinton, Mississippi, to Ashburn, Virginia.

Even before then, however, employees from the MCI side of the merger had taken over top executive posts, while many longtime executives from the old WorldCom were pushed out. In late 2002, the company began moving most of its operations to its campus in Ashburn, which had opened in 2000. Capellas, for instance, spent most of his time in Northern Virginia. After the name change, one executive from the old MCI said, "We're taking our company back." Another wrote in an email, "My company was not founded in a motel coffee shop."

In May 2003, in a controversial deal, the company was given a $45 million no-bid contract by the United States Department of Defense to build a cellular phone service in Iraq as part of the U.S.-led reconstruction effort despite the fact that the company was not known for its expertise in building wireless networks.

WorldCom agreed to pay a civil penalty of $2.25 billion to the U.S. Securities and Exchange Commission. The deal was approved by federal judge Jed Rakoff in July 2003. In a sweeping consent decree, the SEC and Rakoff essentially took control of WorldCom. Rakoff appointed former SEC chairman Richard C. Breeden to oversee WorldCom's compliance with the SEC agreement. Breeden actively involved himself with the management of the company, and prepared a report for Rakoff, titled Restoring Trust, in which he proposed extensive corporate governance reforms, as part of an effort to "cast the new MCI into what he hoped would become a model of how shareholders should be protected and how companies should be run".

=== Post-bankruptcy ===
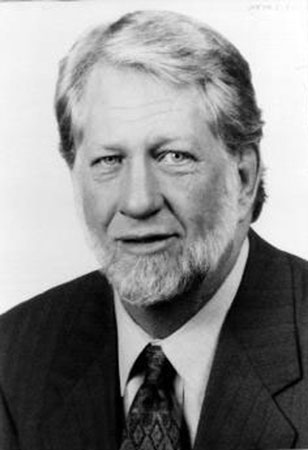
Bernard Ebbers

The company emerged from bankruptcy in 2004 with about $5.7 billion in debt and $6 billion in cash. About half of the cash was intended to pay various claims and settlements. Previous bondholders ended up being paid 35.7 cents on the dollar, in bonds and stock in the new MCI company. The previous stockholders' stock was cancelled.

It had yet to pay many of its creditors, who had waited for two years for a portion of the money owed. Many of the small creditors included former employees, primarily those who were dismissed during June 2002 and whose severance and benefits were withheld when WorldCom filed for bankruptcy.

Citigroup settled with Worldcom investors for $2.65 billion on May 10, 2004. In March 2007, 16 of WorldCom's 17 former underwriters reached settlements with investors.

On March 15, 2005, Ebbers was convicted on all charges related to the $11 billion accounting scandal: fraud, conspiracy and filing false documents with regulators. Other former WorldCom officials charged with criminal penalties in relation to the company's financial misstatements include former CFO Scott Sullivan (entered a guilty plea on March 2, 2004, to one count each of securities fraud, conspiracy to commit securities fraud, and filing false statements), former controller David Myers (pleaded guilty to securities fraud, conspiracy to commit securities fraud, and filing false statements on September 27, 2002), former accounting director Buford Yates (pleaded guilty to conspiracy and fraud charges on October 7, 2002), and former accounting managers Betty Vinson and Troy Normand (both pleading guilty to conspiracy and securities fraud on October 10, 2002).

On July 13, 2005, Ebbers received a sentence that would have kept him imprisoned for 25 years. At time of sentencing, Ebbers was 63 years old. On September 26, 2006, Ebbers surrendered to the Federal Bureau of Prisons prison at Oakdale, Louisiana, the Oakdale Federal Correctional Institution, to begin serving his sentence; he was released in late 2019 for health reasons and died in February 2020, after serving 13 years of his sentence.

In December 2005, Microsoft announced a partnership with MCI to provide Windows Live Messenger customers voice over IP service to make telephone calls—called "MCI Web Calling". After the merger with Verizon, this product was renamed "Verizon Web Calling".

In January 2006, the company was acquired by Verizon Communications and was later integrated into Verizon Business.

== See also ==
- 1-800-COLLECT
- List of corporate collapses and scandals
- Vivien v. WorldCom
