= Interstate Hosiery Mills =

Interstate Hosiery Mills was started in 1932 by two brothers, Harold and Lawrence Greenwald. In a legal settlement, they received an unlimited license to produce a patented pointed toe stocking in a patent held by a company, Gotham Gold Toe Hosiery. Gotham marketed their product with a gold threaded toe so Interstate used a coral band around the top of the stocking. Interstate grew to be the largest hosiery finisher in the United States until the accounting discrepancy was uncovered in 1937.

The company operated until 1954 at which time Harold retired and Lawrence brokered an employment agreement with the purchaser of the assets, Burlington Industries. Lawrence went on to be president of Burlington's division, Patentex, and later founder and chairman of Hurst Performance Products, Inc., the company which invented the jaws of life, a patent which they gave to the public domain at no cost.

Interstate Hosiery Mills was a company involved in a case of fraudulent stock manipulation in the 1930s. Raymond Marien was an accountant for Homes & Davis in charge of the accounting of Interstate Hosiery. He inflated assets by $1.9 million, about 40% of the book value. He was exonerated for financial gain but was convicted of a minor check-cashing forgery.

The resulting scandal, among others, led to reform of accounting standards and increased SEC oversight.
