= Babakou =

Place in Burkina Faso

- Rural commune
- Location in Burkina Faso
- Coordinates: 11°24′55.4″N 0°01′13.9″E
- Country: Burkina Faso
- Region: Centre-Est Region
- Province: Koulpelogo Province
- Department: Ouargaye Department

Population (2019)
  - Total: 525

Babakou is a populate place located in the Ouargaye Department, Koulpelogo Province, Centre-Est Region in Burkina Faso.
