= Dourtenga =

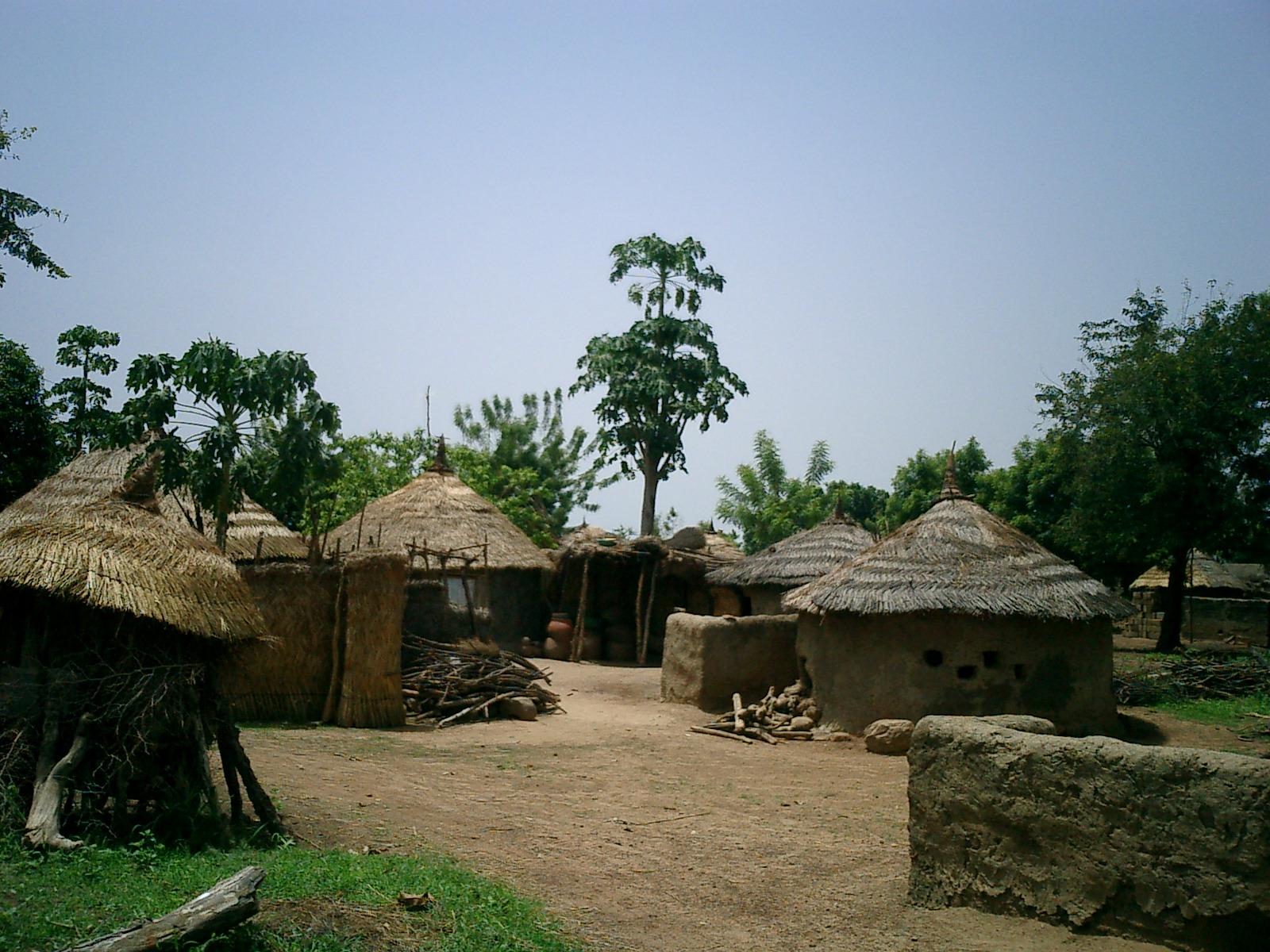

- Location in Burkina Faso
- Coordinates: 11°43′N 0°0′E
- Country: Burkina Faso
- Region: Centre-Est Region
- Province: Koulpélogo Province
- Department: Dourtenga Department

Population (1996)
  - Total: 3,276

Dourtenga is a small town in the Dourtenga Department of Balé Province in southern Burkina Faso. It is the capital of the Dourtenga Department and the town has a total population of 3,276. On 17 March 2026, JNIM militants attacked the village, killing 9 VDP militiamen and 3 civilians.

== Climate ==
Köppen-Geiger climate classification system classifies its climate as hot semi-arid (BSh) and closely borders with tropical wet and dry (Aw).

Climate data for Dourtenga
Month	Jan	Feb	Mar	Apr	May	Jun	Jul	Aug	Sep	Oct	Nov	Dec	Year
Mean daily maximum °C (°F)	34.4 (93.9)	36.3 (97.3)	38.8 (101.8)	38.9 (102.0)	36.4 (97.5)	33.7 (92.7)	31.3 (88.3)	30.3 (86.5)	31.4 (88.5)	34.7 (94.5)	36 (97)	34.4 (93.9)	34.7 (94.5)
Daily mean °C (°F)	26.3 (79.3)	28.5 (83.3)	31.3 (88.3)	32.2 (90.0)	30.5 (86.9)	28.3 (82.9)	26.6 (79.9)	25.9 (78.6)	26.4 (79.5)	28.2 (82.8)	27.7 (81.9)	26.3 (79.3)	28.2 (82.7)
Mean daily minimum °C (°F)	18.3 (64.9)	20.8 (69.4)	23.9 (75.0)	25.5 (77.9)	24.7 (76.5)	22.9 (73.2)	21.9 (71.4)	21.5 (70.7)	21.4 (70.5)	21.7 (71.1)	19.5 (67.1)	18.2 (64.8)	21.7 (71.0)
Average precipitation mm (inches)	0 (0)	2 (0.1)	9 (0.4)	29 (1.1)	78 (3.1)	108 (4.3)	177 (7.0)	233 (9.2)	154 (6.1)	35 (1.4)	2 (0.1)	2 (0.1)	829 (32.9)
Average rainy days (≥ 1 mm)	0	0	0	3	6	9	13	16	13	5	0	0	65
Source 1: Climate-Data.org
Source 2: Storm247 for rainy days

== Gallery ==
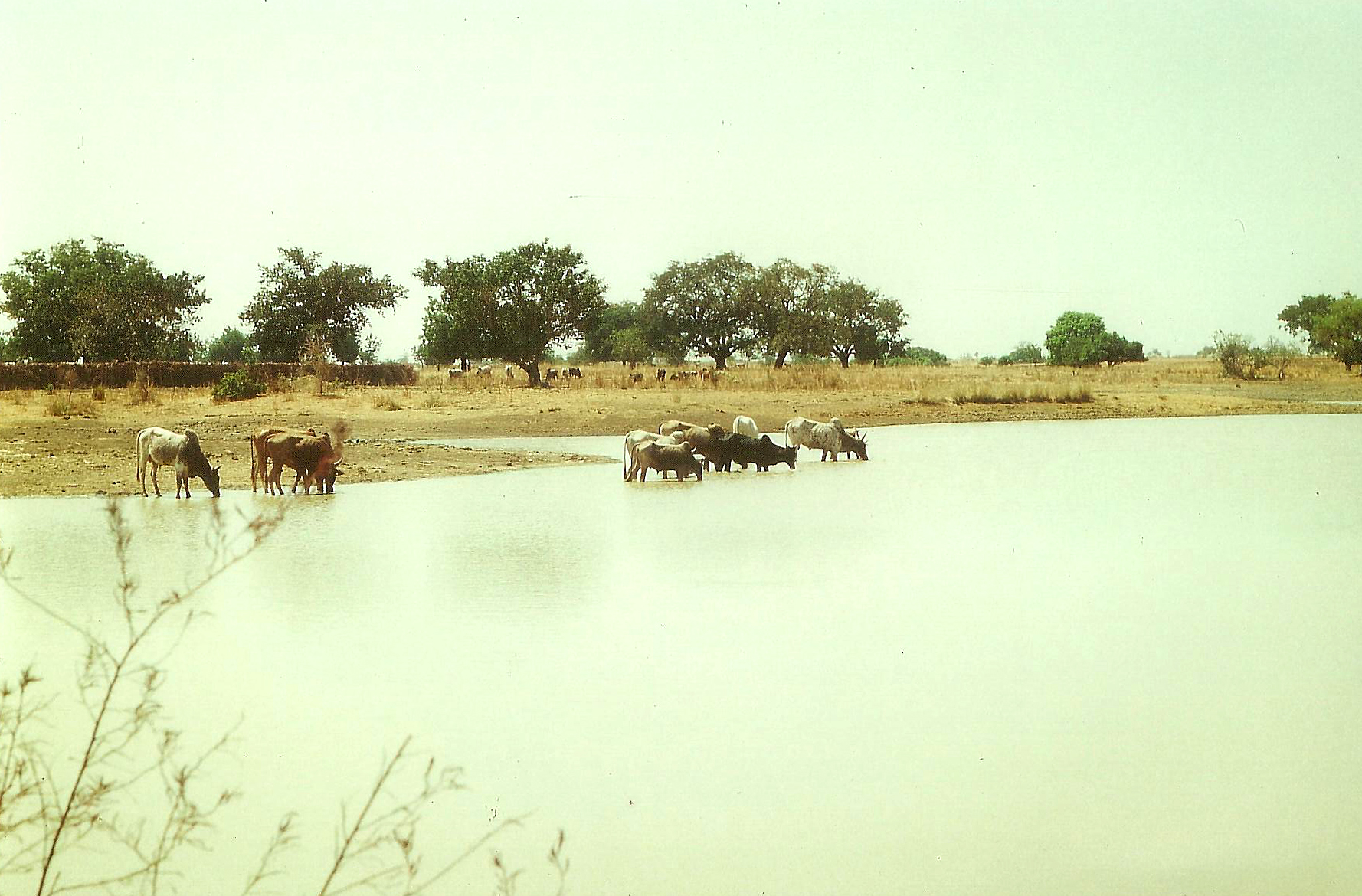
Dourtenga lake

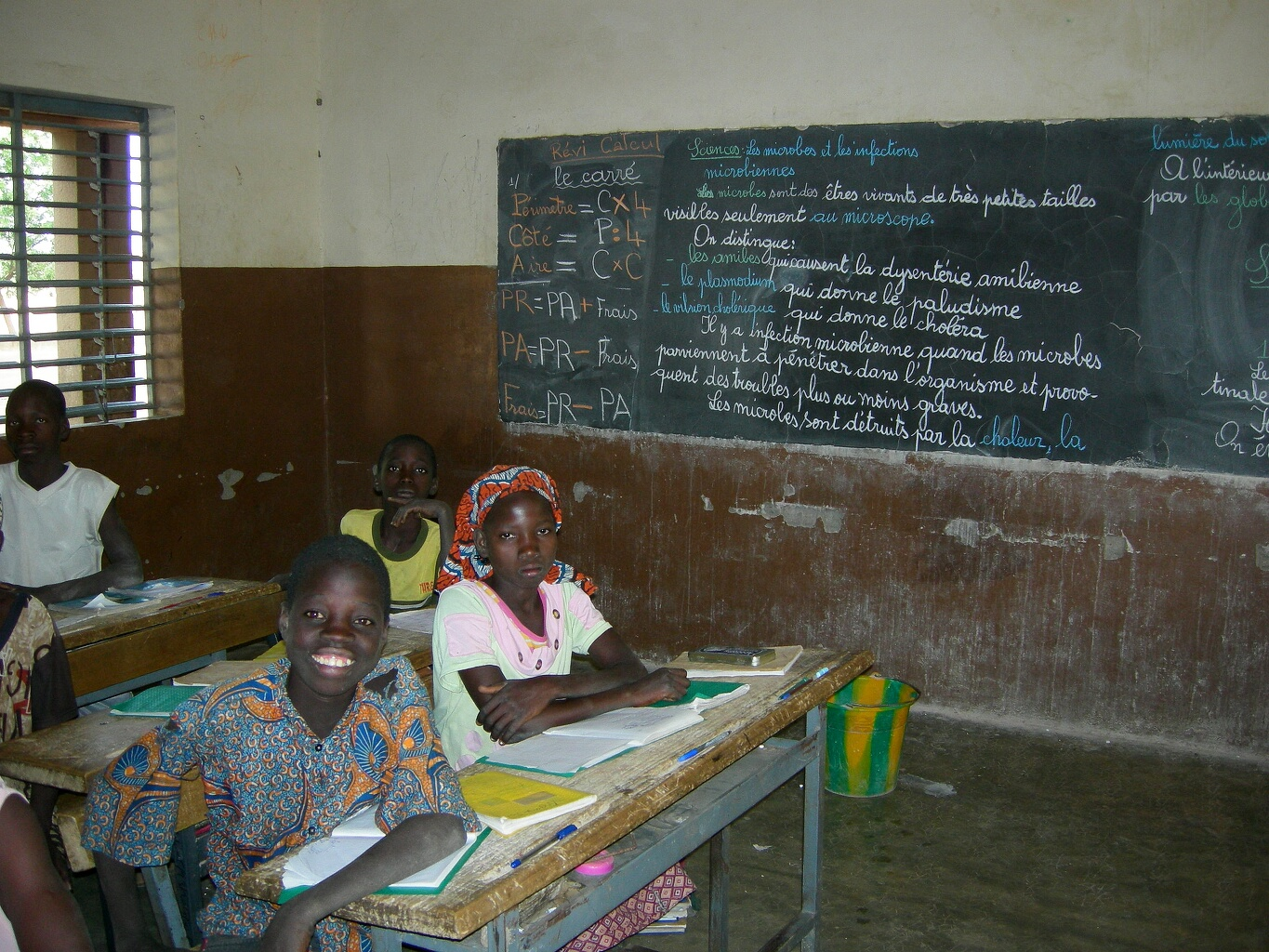
Dourtenga school children

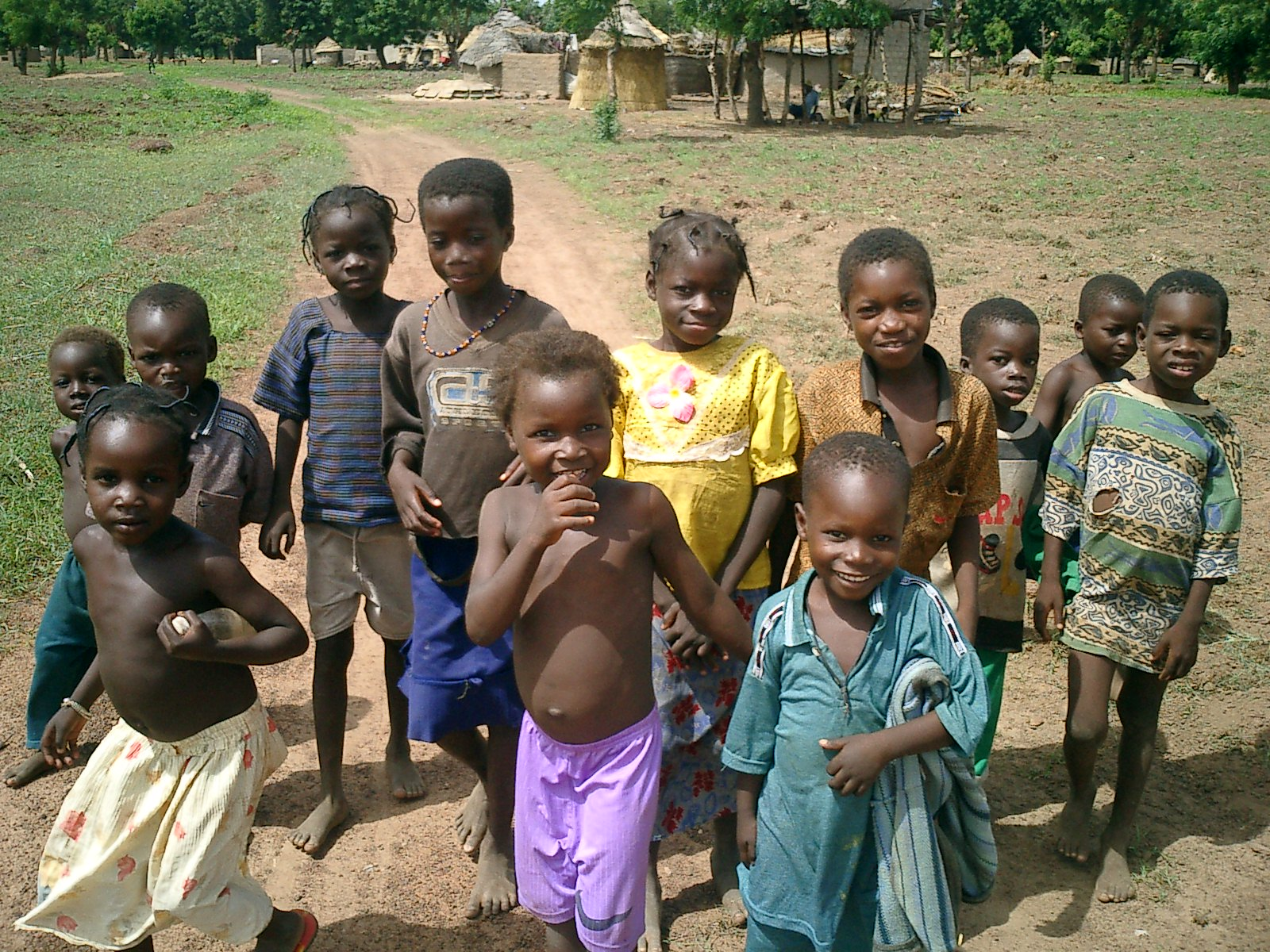
Children of Dourtenga
