= Soudougui Department =

Coordinates: 11°12′06″N 0°19′25″E

Soudougui
- Department
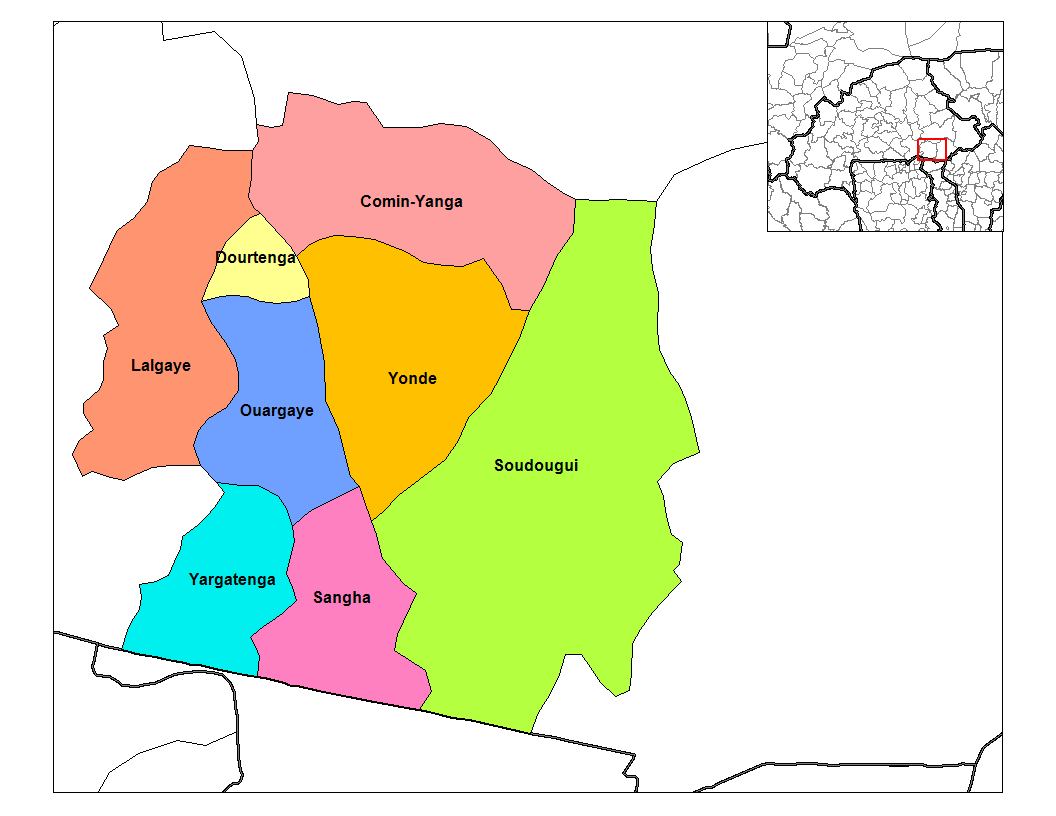
- Soudougui Department location in the province
- Country: Burkina Faso
- Province: Koulpélogo Province

Area
  - Total: 754 sq mi (1,954 km^{2})

Population (2019 census)
  - Total: 92,179
  - Density: 122.2/sq mi (47.17/km^{2})
- Time zone: UTC+0 (GMT 0)

Soudougui is a department or commune of Koulpélogo Province in eastern Burkina Faso. Its capital is the town of Soudougui. According to the 2019 census the department has a total population of 92,179.

== Towns and villages ==
- Soudougui (2 456 inhabitants) (capital)
- Bagmoussa (1 024 inhabitants)
- Boudangou (4 995 inhabitants)
- Boudou (816 inhabitants)
- Diakarga (1 643 inhabitants)
- Diakarga-Peulh (561 inhabitants)
- Dienbende (3 376 inhabitants)
- Dienbende–Diori (978 inhabitants)
- Kamse (1 892 inhabitants)
- Kandaghin (520 inhabitants)
- Kianghin (498 inhabitants)
- Koadjidjoal (169 inhabitants)
- Konianwende (383 inhabitants)
- Koudiorgou (1 516 inhabitants)
- Koulpalga (874 inhabitants)
- Koulsonde (1 600 inhabitants)
- Koultianga (1 117 inhabitants)
- Konyelenbere (307 inhabitants)
- Modaogo (2 450 inhabitants)
- Nabangou (1 155 inhabitants)
- Naloanga (1 047 inhabitants)
- Napade (2 804 inhabitants)
- Napiga (427 inhabitants)
- Noulibouli (388 inhabitants)
- Pilogre (720 inhabitants)
- Sandiaba (1 248 inhabitants)
- Sisse (451 inhabitants)
- Sitipiga (1 432 inhabitants)
- Sologo (1 247 inhabitants)
- Soudoubila (1 591 inhabitants)
- Vilianga-Gourma (1 113 inhabitants)
- Vilianga-Mossi (2 383 inhabitants)
- Waidjoaga (1 474 inhabitants)
- Waidjoaga-Peulh (302 inhabitants)
- Yoabghin (1 371 inhabitants)
- Youanga (212 inhabitants)
- Zongo (674 inhabitants)
- Zoungou-Peulh (107 inhabitants)
