= Kogo =

Kogo can refer to:

- Kogo, an alternate name for the town of Cogo, Equatorial Guinea
- Kogo, a town in Ouargaye Department, Koulpélogo Province, Burkina Faso
- Kogo, the name of several towns in Nigeria
- Kōgō (empress), the Japanese name for empress consorts
- Kōgō (incense box), an incense box used in Japanese tea ceremony
- KOGO (AM), a talk radio station in San Diego, California, United States
- KSSX, a radio station (95.7 FM) licensed to serve Carlsbad, California, United States, which held the call sign KOGO-FM from 2011 to 2013
- Kogo Kingdom, a former polity in the area of Faskari, Katsina, Nigeria
- Kogo Shūi, a historical record of the Inbe clan of Japan
- 5684 Kogo, a Main-belt Asteroid

People named Kogo include:

- Benjamin Kogo, a Kenyan steeplechase runner
- Kogo Noda (野田 高梧, 1893–1968), Japanese screenwriter
- Micah Kogo, a Kenyan long-distance runner
