= Ouargaye Department =

Coordinates: 11.4767°N 0.0494°E

Ouargaye
- Department
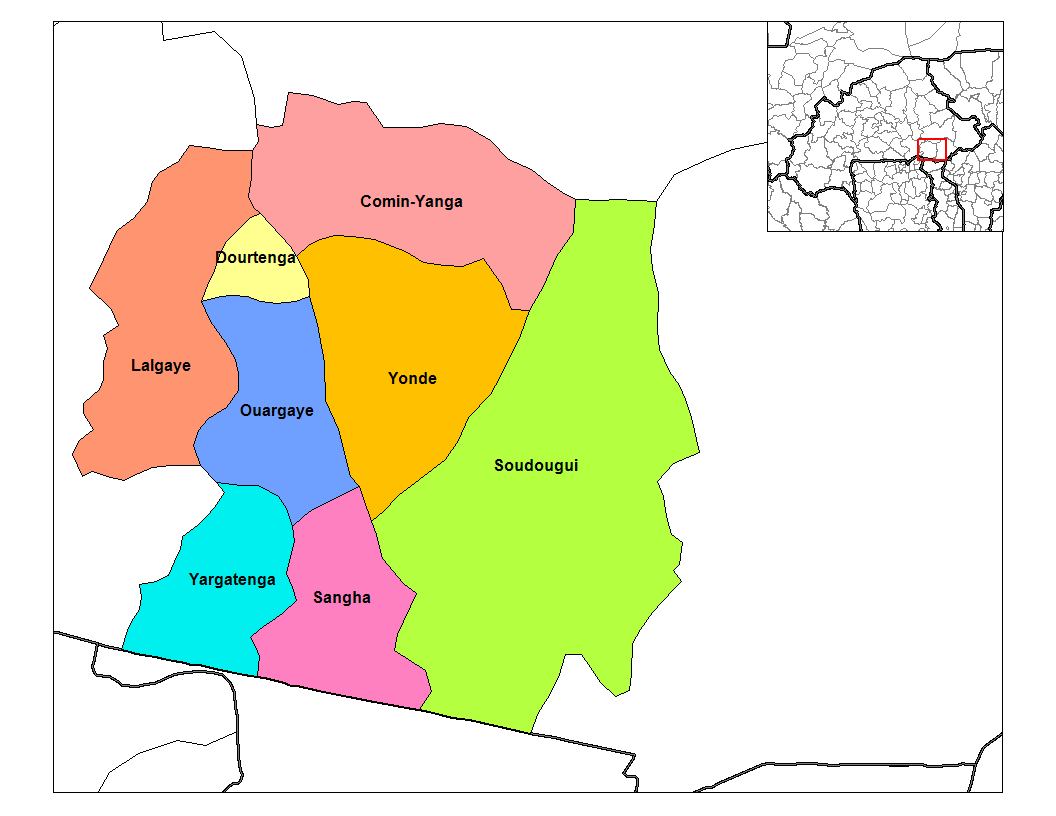
- Ouargaye Department location in the province
- Country: Burkina Faso
- Province: Koulpélogo Province

Area
  - Department: 136 sq mi (351 km^{2})

Population (2019 census)
  - Department: 42,613
  - Density: 314/sq mi (121/km^{2})
  - Urban: 13,431
- Time zone: UTC+0 (GMT 0)

Ouargaye is a department or commune of Koulpélogo Province in eastern Burkina Faso. Its capital is the town of Ouargaye. According to the 2019 census the department has a total population of 42,613.

== Towns and villages ==
- Ouargaye (13 431 inhabitants) (capital)
- Babakou (406 inhabitants)
- Bittin (1 150 inhabitants)
- Boudoughin (794 inhabitants)
- Dimtenga (1 490 inhabitants)
- Kogo (1 171 inhabitants)
- Konglore (1 953 inhabitants)
- Koundoghin (1 631 inhabitants)
- Lerghin (1 094 inhabitants)
- Mene (4 016 inhabitants)
- Naboudin (965 inhabitants)
- Naganga (3 938 inhabitants)
- Tessoaghin (1 251 inhabitants)
