= Yargatenga Department =

Commune in Burkina Faso

Coordinates: 11°12′45″N 0°03′10″E

Yargatenga
- Department
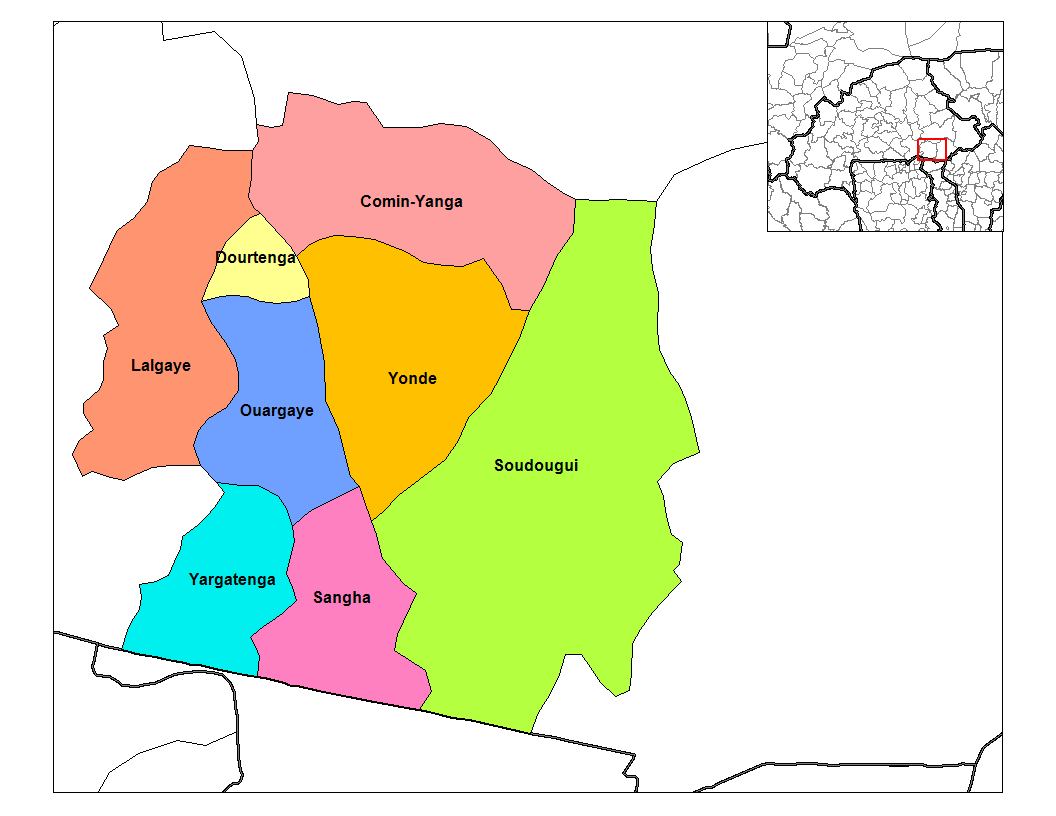
- Yargatenga Department location in the province
- Country: Burkina Faso
- Province: Koulpélogo Province

Area
  - Total: 169 sq mi (438 km^{2})

Population (2019 census)
  - Total: 57,754
  - Density: 342/sq mi (132/km^{2})
- Time zone: UTC+0 (GMT 0)

Yargatenga is a department (or commune) of Koulpélogo Province in eastern Burkina Faso. Its largest town is Cinkansé. According to the 2019 census, the department had a total population of 57,754.

== Towns and villages ==
- Yargatenga (3,593 inhabitants) (capital)
- Bama (233 inhabitants)
- Besseme (893 inhabitants)
- Bilemtenga (2,544 inhabitants)
- Bou (783 inhabitants)
- Cinkansé (9,360 inhabitants)
- Dirihoré (1,050 inhabitants)
- Doukbolé (734 inhabitants)
- Hornogo (1,988 inhabitants)
- Kampoaga (1,572 inhabitants)
- Kiniwaga (527 inhabitants)
- Kiongo (1,461 inhabitants)
- Métémété (663 inhabitants)
- Sibtenga (1,266 inhabitants)
- Tounougou Toné (1,263 inhabitants)
- Waongo (4,127 inhabitants)
- Yoyo (2,449 inhabitants)
- Zoaga (1,691 inhabitants)
