= Lalgaye Department =

Coordinates: 11°36′N 0°04′W

Lalgaye
- Department
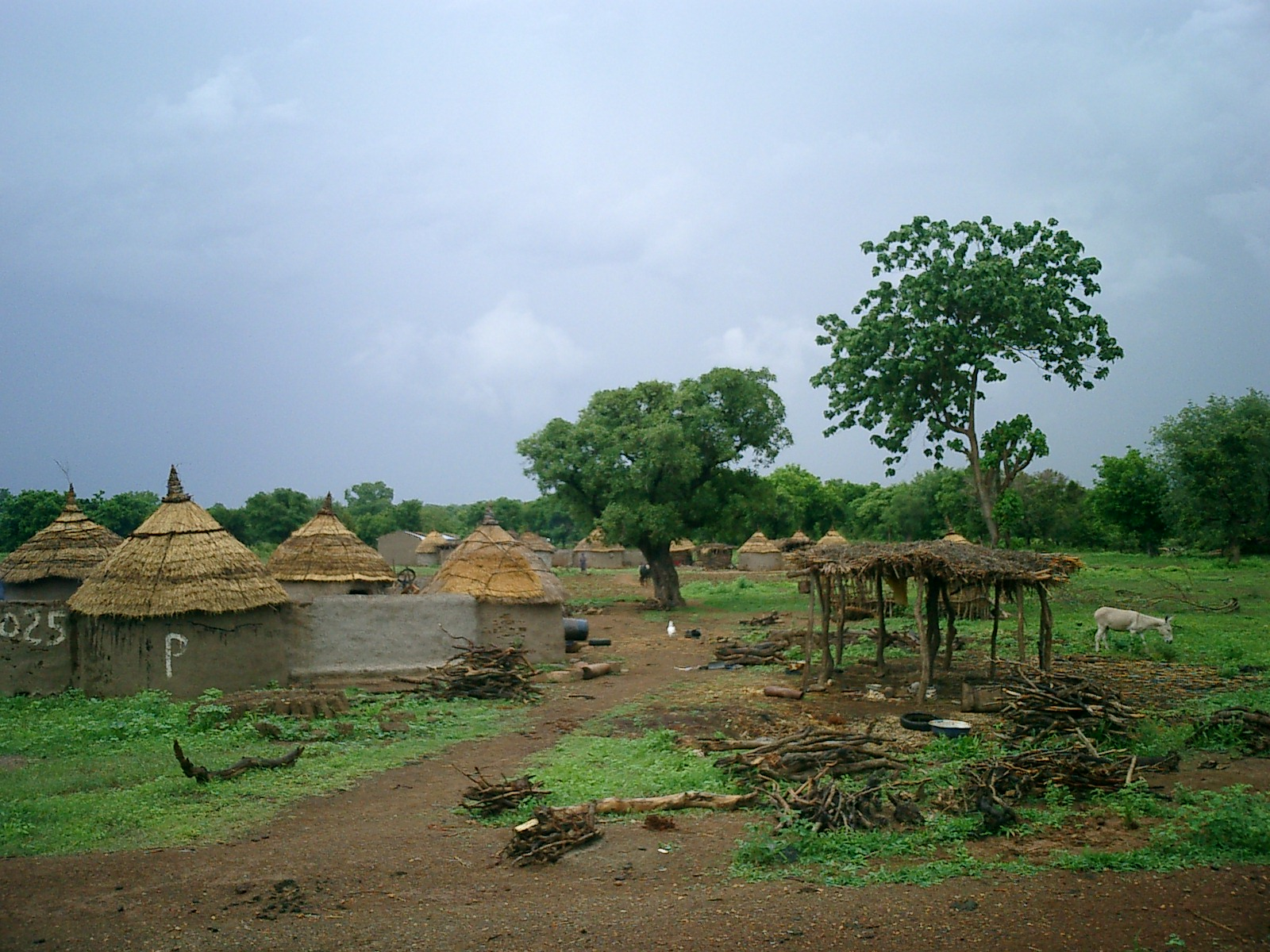
- Lalgaye

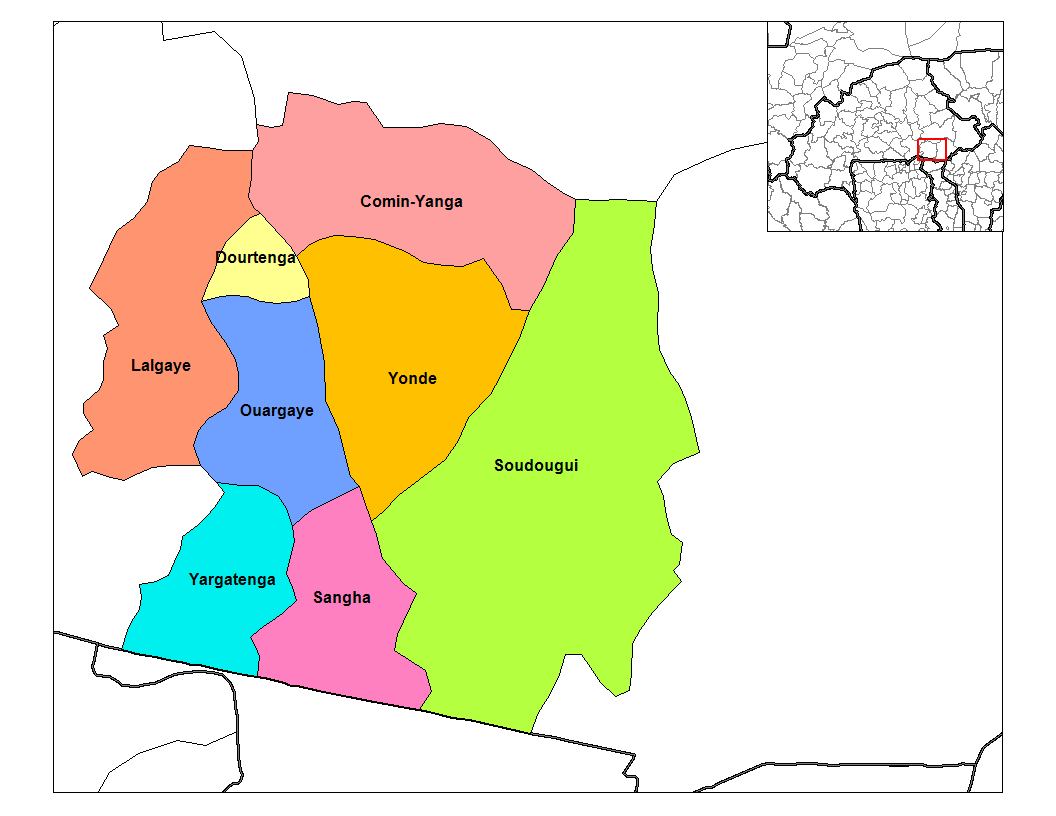
- Lalgaye Department location in the province
- Country: Burkina Faso
- Province: Koulpélogo Province

Area
  - Total: 256.6 sq mi (664.5 km^{2})

Population (2019)
  - Total: 19,436
  - Density: 75.75/sq mi (29.25/km^{2})
- Time zone: UTC+0 (GMT 0)

Lalgaye is a department or commune of Koulpélogo Province in eastern Burkina Faso. Its capital lies at the town of Lalgaye. According to the 1996 census the department has a total population of 19,436.

== Towns and villages ==
- Lalgaye (4 172 inhabitants) (capital)
- Dibli (982 inhabitants)
- Gouli (632 inhabitants)
- Guini (651 inhabitants)
- Kieblin (312 inhabitants)
- Kimzim (648 inhabitants)
- Lalgaye (2 069 inhabitants)
- Lalgaye Yarce (437 inhabitants)
- Nassiega (1 125 inhabitants)
- Pihitenga (692 inhabitants)
- Paore (342 inhabitants)
- Pissiongo (260 inhabitants)
- Sablogo (970 inhabitants)
- Tensobentenga (2 292 inhabitants)
- Tiguetin (990 inhabitants)
- Yalgo (2 117 inhabitants)
