= Yondé Department =

Coordinates: 11°29′41″N 0°08′48″E

Yondé
- Department
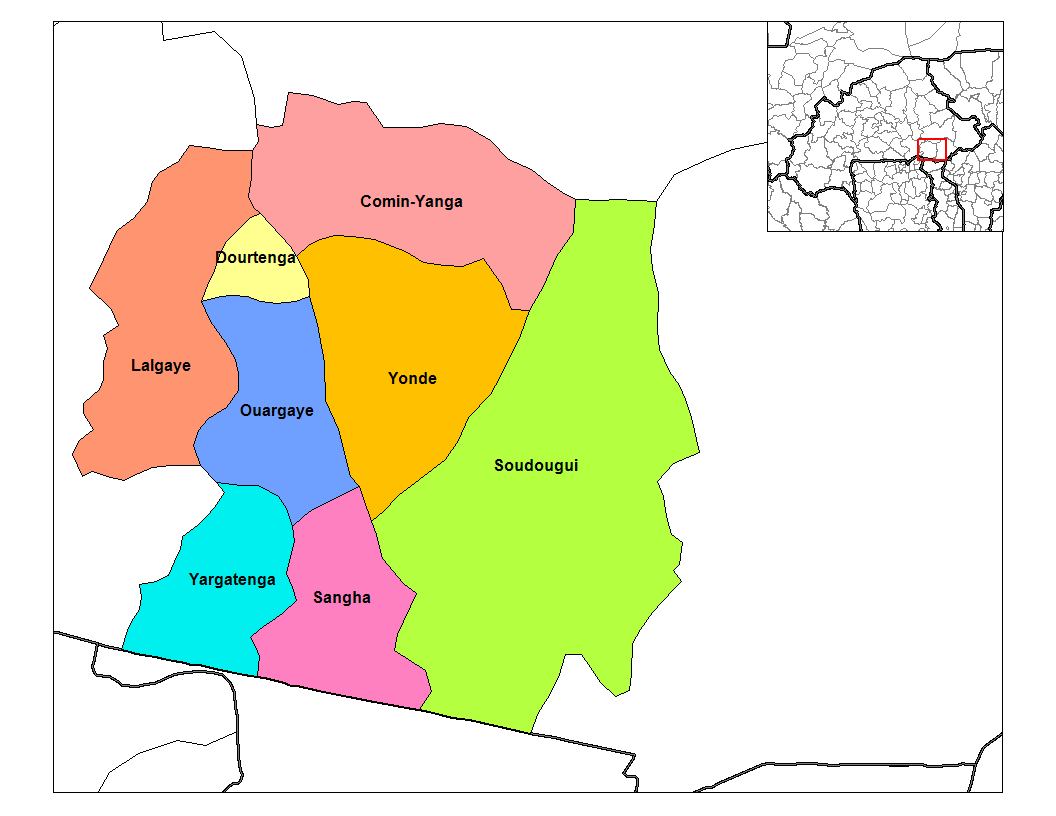
- Yondé Department location in the province
- Country: Burkina Faso
- Province: Koulpélogo Province

Area
  - Total: 244.6 sq mi (633.4 km^{2})

Population (2019 census)
  - Total: 33,972
  - Density: 138.9/sq mi (53.63/km^{2})
- Time zone: UTC+0 (GMT 0)

Yondé is a department or commune of Koulpélogo Province in eastern Burkina Faso. Its capital lies at the town of Yondé. According to the 2019 census the department has a total population of 33,972.

== Towns and villages ==
- Yondé (2 884 inhabitants) (capital)
- Baoghin (878 inhabitants)
- Boussirabogo (2 835 inhabitants)
- Dabogo (1 374 inhabitants)
- Dazinre (233 inhabitants)
- Foulbado-Mossi (408 inhabitants)
- Gnanghin (965 inhabitants)
- Gnogzinse (647 inhabitants)
- Kamseogo (1 250 inhabitants)
- Kamseogo-Feulh (97 inhabitants)
- Kidibi (958 inhabitants)
- Koadiga (585 inhabitants)
- Kondogo (1 123 inhabitants)
- Loume (871 inhabitants)
- Napenga (745 inhabitants)
- Nobsgogo (83 inhabitants)
- Niorgo-Yanga (770 inhabitants)
- Pogoyoaga (1 057 inhabitants)
- Salembaore (4 370 inhabitants)
- Welguemsibou (873 inhabitants)
- Wobgo (643 inhabitants)
- Yactibo (1 040 inhabitants)
- Yonde-Peulh (181 inhabitants)
- Yorghin (391 inhabitants)
