= Comin-Yanga Department =

Coordinates: 11°41′59″N 0°08′13″E

Comin-Yanga
- Department
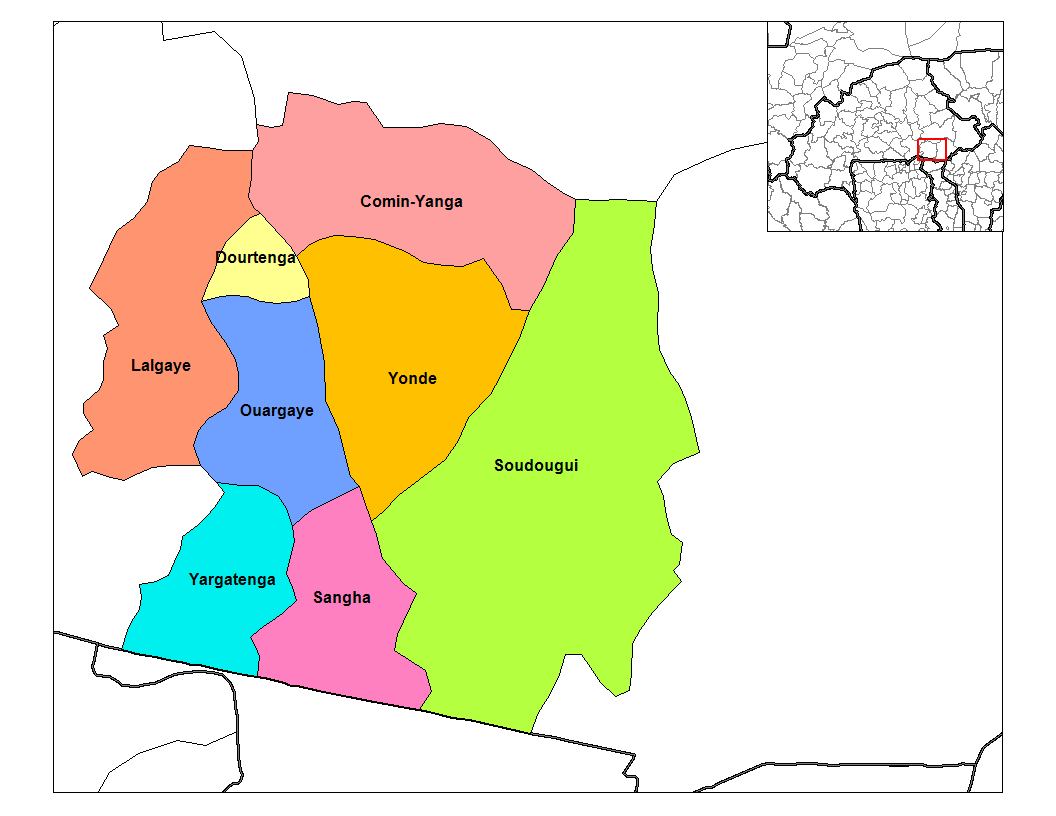
- Comin-Yanga Department location in the province
- Country: Burkina Faso
- Province: Koulpélogo Province

Area
  - Total: 305 sq mi (789 km^{2})

Population (2019 census)
  - Total: 48,260
  - Density: 158/sq mi (61.2/km^{2})
- Time zone: UTC+0 (GMT 0)

Comin-Yanga is a department or commune of Koulpélogo Province in eastern Burkina Faso. Its capital is the town of Comin-Yanga. According to the 2019 census the department has a total population of 48,260.

== Towns and villages ==
- Comin-Yanga (5,373 inhabitants) (capital)
- Baglenga (271 inhabitants)
- Balboudi (438 inhabitants)
- Bangoghin (350 inhabitants)
- Coewinga (463 inhabitants)
- Dogtenga (2,721 inhabitants)
- Gagare (1,672 inhabitants)
- Gaonghin (438 inhabitants)
- Kakati (1,611 inhabitants)
- Kamdiokin (1,051 inhabitants)
- Karmé (123 inhabitants)
- Kiougou-Doure (729 inhabitants)
- Kiougou-Kandaga (1,673 inhabitants)
- Kiougou-Namounou (182 inhabitants)
- Kisbouga (1,013 inhabitants)
- Kohogo (1,918 inhabitants)
- Kohogo-Peulh (61 inhabitants)
- Kolanga (450 inhabitants)
- Konzeogo-Bangane (153 inhabitants)
- Konzeogo-Sambila (1,294 inhabitants)
- Konzeogo-Yalgo (389 inhabitants)
- Lamiougou (1,720 inhabitants)
- Moaga (153 inhabitants)
- Pilede (430 inhabitants)
- Pognankoudougou-Rabogo (199 inhabitants)
- Sabrado (1,038 inhabitants)
- Sakango (1,690 inhabitants)
- Sakidissi (237 inhabitants)
- Sougoudi (276 inhabitants)
- Tanziega (147 inhabitants)
- Tiré (383 inhabitants)
- Vohogdin (5,800 inhabitants)
- Youtenga (484 inhabitants)
- Zonghin (1,502 inhabitants)
