= Dourtenga Department =

Coordinates: 11°44′N 0°0′E

Dourtenga
- Department
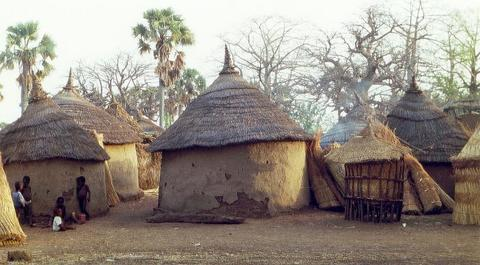
- Dourtenga town

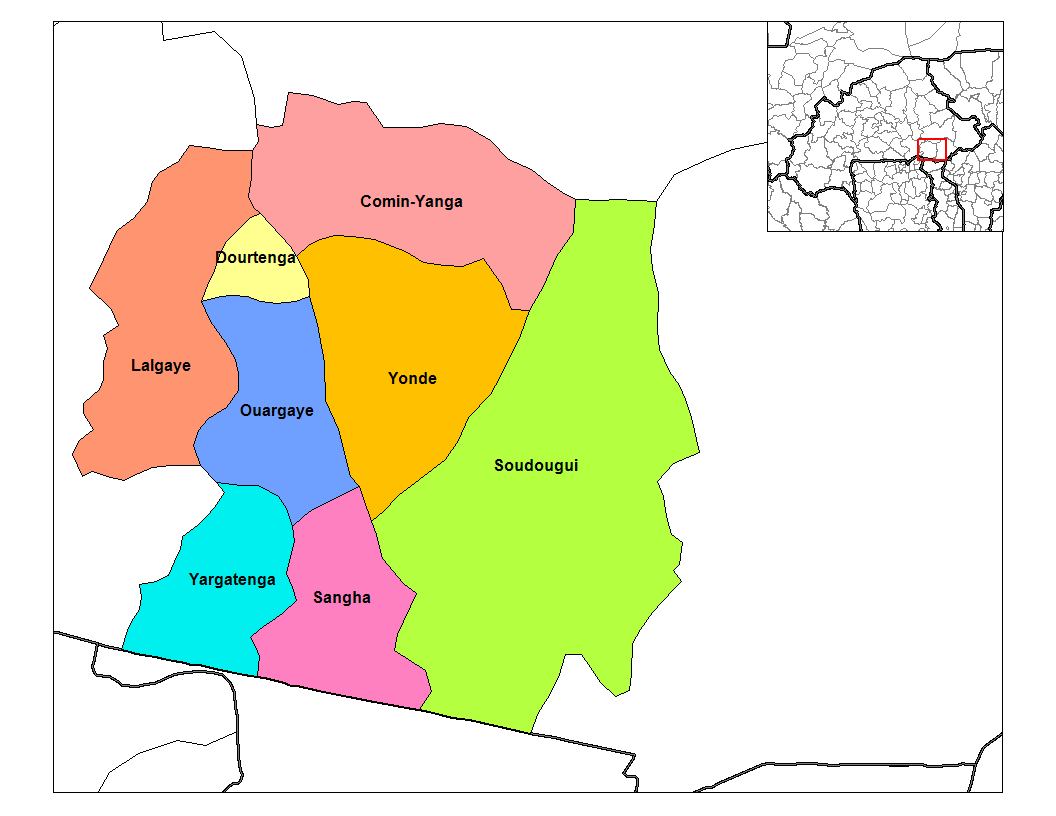
- Dourtenga Department location in the province
- Country: Burkina Faso
- Province: Koulpélogo Province

Area
  - Total: 39.4 sq mi (102.1 km^{2})

Population (2019)
  - Total: 13,770
  - Density: 349.3/sq mi (134.9/km^{2})
- Time zone: UTC+0 (GMT 0)

Dourtenga is a department or commune of Koulpélogo Province in eastern Burkina Faso. Its capital lies at the town of Dourtenga. According to the 2019 census the department has a total population of 13,770.

== Towns and villages ==
- Dourtenga (3 276 inhabitants) (capital)
- Gogo (578 inhabitants)
- Gorin (406 inhabitants)
- Kangretenga (617 inhabitants)
- Kanle (267 inhabitants)
- Katoulbere (831 inhabitants)
- Niondin (473 inhabitants)
- Sougoudin (1 039 inhabitants)
- Tangoko (505 inhabitants)
- Yambili (316 inhabitants)
- Youmtenga (66 inhabitants)
- Zergoama (319 inhabitants)
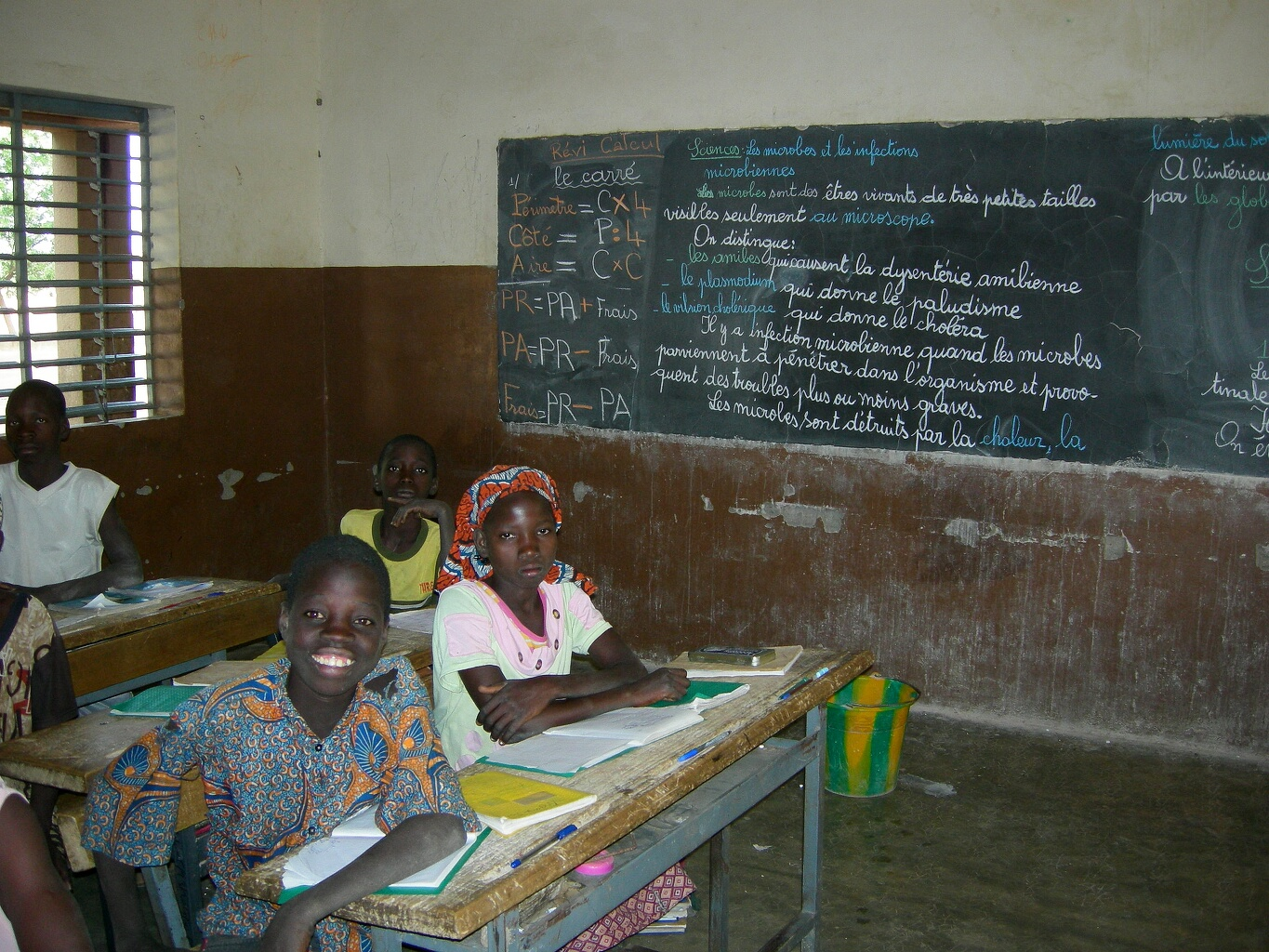
School in Dourtenga

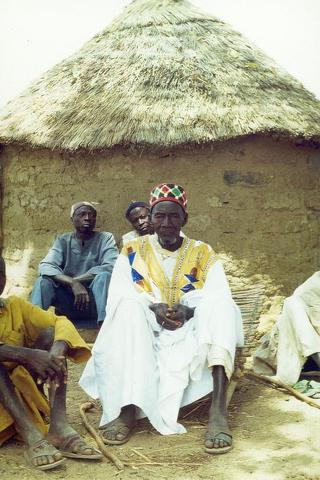
Chief of Dourtenga

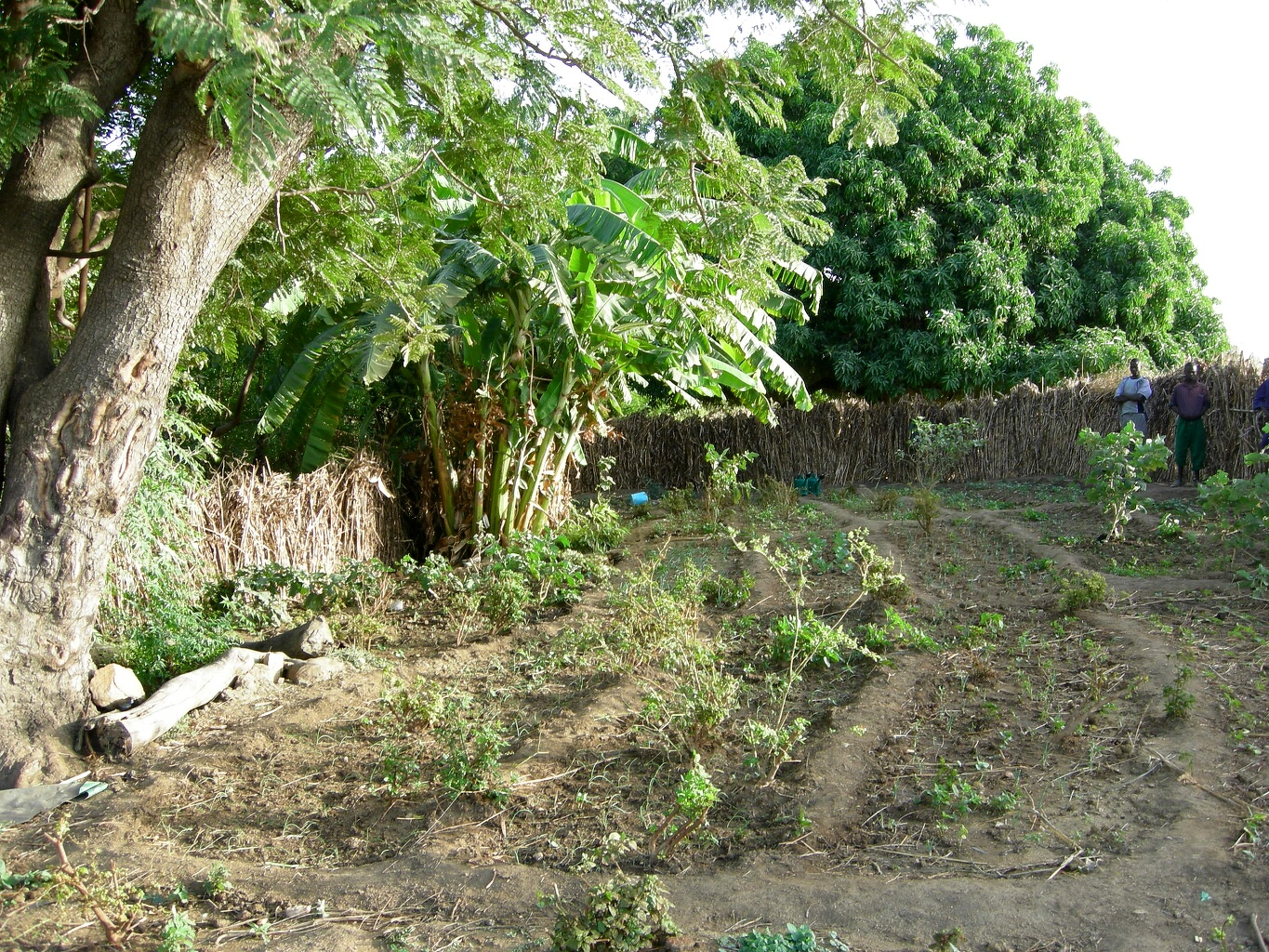
A garden in Dourtenga
