= Koulpélogo Province =

Coordinates: 11°25′N 0°10′E

Koulpélogo
- Province
- Location in Burkina Faso

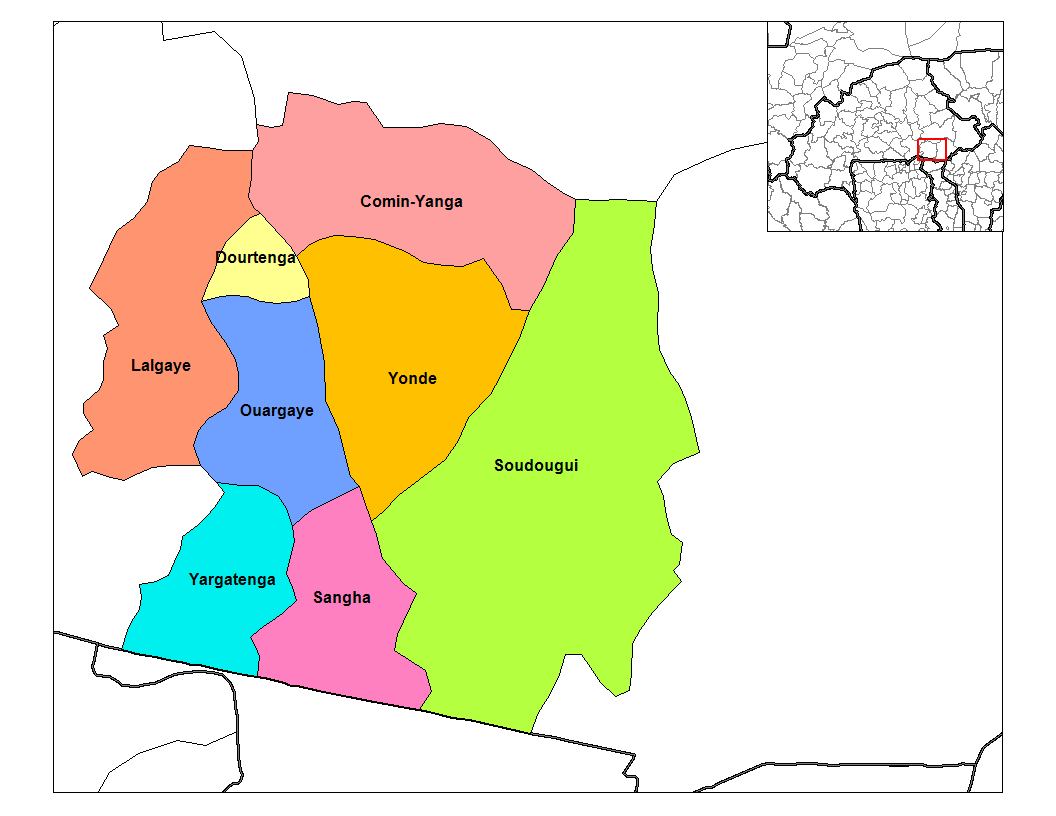
- Provincial map of its departments
- Country: Burkina Faso
- Region: Centre-Est Region
- Capital: Ouargaye

Area
  - Province: 5,348 km^{2} (2,065 sq mi)

Population (2019 census)
  - Province: 361,586
  - Density: 67.61/km^{2} (175.1/sq mi)
  - Urban: 13,431
- Time zone: UTC+0 (GMT 0)

Koulpélogo is one of the 45 provinces of Burkina Faso, located in its Centre-Est Region. The population in 2019 was 361,586.

Its capital is Ouargaye.

== Departments ==
Koulpelogo is divided into 8 departments:

The Departments of Koulpélogo
Department	Capital city	Population (Census 2006)
Comin-Yanga Department	Comin-Yanga	37,985
Dourtenga Department	Dourtenga	9,538
Lalgaye Department	Lalgaye	15,063
Ouargaye Department	Ouargaye	34,288
Sangha Department	Sangha	46,461
Soudougui Department	Soudougui	49,310
Yargatenga Department	Yargatenga	41,009
Yondé Department	Yondé	25,741

== See also ==
- Regions of Burkina Faso
- Provinces of Burkina Faso
- Departments of Burkina Faso
