= Boudangou =

Coordinates: 12.1333°N 0.3333°E

- Interactive map of Boudangou
- Country: Burkina Faso
- Region: Est Region
- Province: Gnagna Province
- Department: Manni Department

Population (2019)
  - Total: 1,343

Boudangou is a town in the Manni Department of Gnagna Province in eastern Burkina Faso.

Population
Year	Pop.	±%
1985	3,170	—
2006	4,715	+48.7%
2019	1,343	−71.5%
