= Nakambé Region =

Region of Burkina Faso

Nakambé Centre-Est
- Region
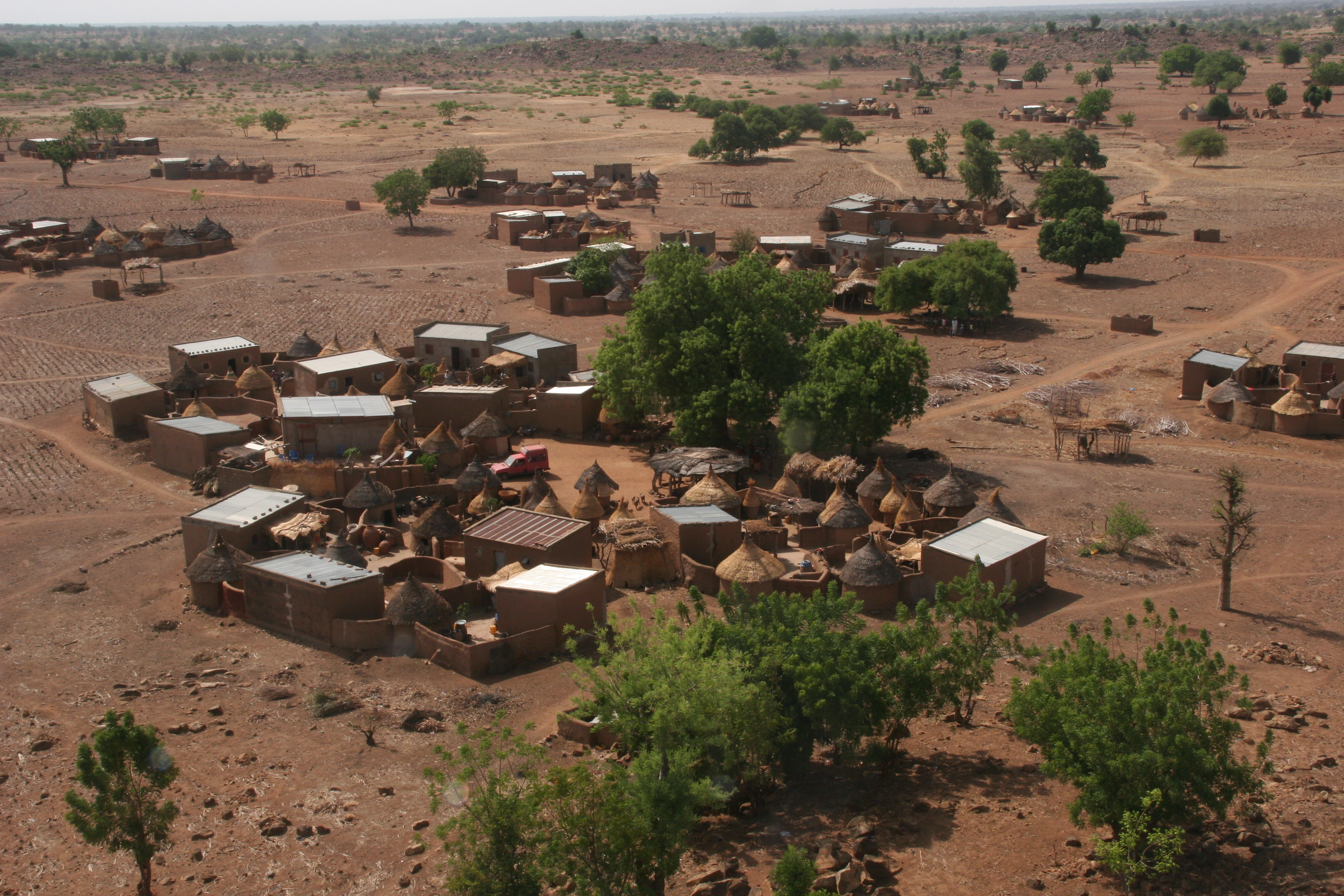
- A village in the region

- Location in Burkina Faso
- Coordinates: 11°30′N 0°15′W
- Country: Burkina Faso
- Capital: Tenkodogo

Area
  - Region: 14,656 km^{2} (5,659 sq mi)

Population (2019 census)
  - Region: 1,578,075
  - Density: 107.67/km^{2} (278.88/sq mi)
  - Urban: 292,856
- Time zone: UTC+0 (GMT 0)
- HDI (2017): 0.418 low · 6th

Nakambé, formerly known as Centre-Est ([sɑ̃tʁ.ɛst], "East Central"), is one of Burkina Faso's 17 administrative regions. The population of Nakambé was 1,578,075 in 2019. The region's capital is Tenkodogo. Three provinces (Boulgou, Koulpélogo, and Kouritenga) make up the region.

As of 2019, the population of the region was 1,578,075 with 53.5% females. The population in the region was 7.7% of the total population of the country. The child mortality rate was 39, infant mortality rate was 56 and the mortality of children under five was 93. As of 2007, the literacy rate in the region was 16.6%, compared with a national average of 28.3%.

== Geography and ecology ==
Most of Burkina Faso is a wide plateau formed by riverine systems and is called falaise de Banfora. There are three major rivers, the Red Volta, Black Volta and White Volta, which cut through different valleys. Gold and quartz are common minerals found across the country, while manganese deposits are also common.

The soil texture is porous and hence the yield is also poor. The average elevation is around 200 m (660 ft) to 300 m (980 ft) above mean sea level. Among West African countries, Burkino Faso has the largest elephant population and the country is replete with game reserves.

The principal river is the Red Volta, that originates in the northern region and drains into Ghana. The areas near the rivers usually have flies like tsetse and similium, which are carriers of sleep sickness and river blindness.

== Climate ==
The climate is generally hot, with unreliable rains across different seasons. The dry season is usually from October to May and rains are common during the wet season from June to September.

The northern regions are generally arid and usually have scrub land and semi-deserts. The average rainfall in the region is around 25 cm (9.8 in) compared with southern regions that receive only 100 cm (39 in) rainfall.

The region has dry conditions but extreme events (flooding and drought) also occur frequently.

== Demographics ==
Historical population
Year	Pop.	±% p.a.
1985	675,533	—
1996	853,099	+2.14%
2006	1,132,016	+2.87%
2019	1,578,075	+2.59%

Province	Capital	2006
Boulgou Province	Tenkodogo	542,286
Koulpélogo Province	Ouargaye	259,395
Kouritenga Province	Koupéla	330,342

As of 2019, the population of the region was 1,578,075 with 53.5% females. The population in the region was 7.7% of the total population of the country. The child mortality rate was 39, infant mortality rate was 56 and the mortality of children under five was 93. As of 2007, among the working population, there were 68.9% employees, 11.9% under employed, 18.2% inactive people, 19.2% not working and 1% unemployed people in the region.

In the rural communities in the sub-basin Nouaho sub-basin, which is part of the larger Nakanbé basin, there are several ethnic groups: the Mossi (mainly agriculturalists who are now (as of 2021) also moving towards livestock production), and the Peul (mainly pastoralists who are now also turning to growing crops).

=== Education ===
As of 2007, the literacy rate in the region was 16.6 per cent, compared with a national average of 28.3 per cent. The gross primary enrolment was 64.8 per cent, pos-primary was 18 per cent and gross secondary school enrolment was 4.4. There were 118 boys and 112 girls enrolled in the primary and post-secondary level. There were 17 teachers in primary and post-secondary level, while there were 500 teachers in post-primary and post-secondary level.

== Economy ==
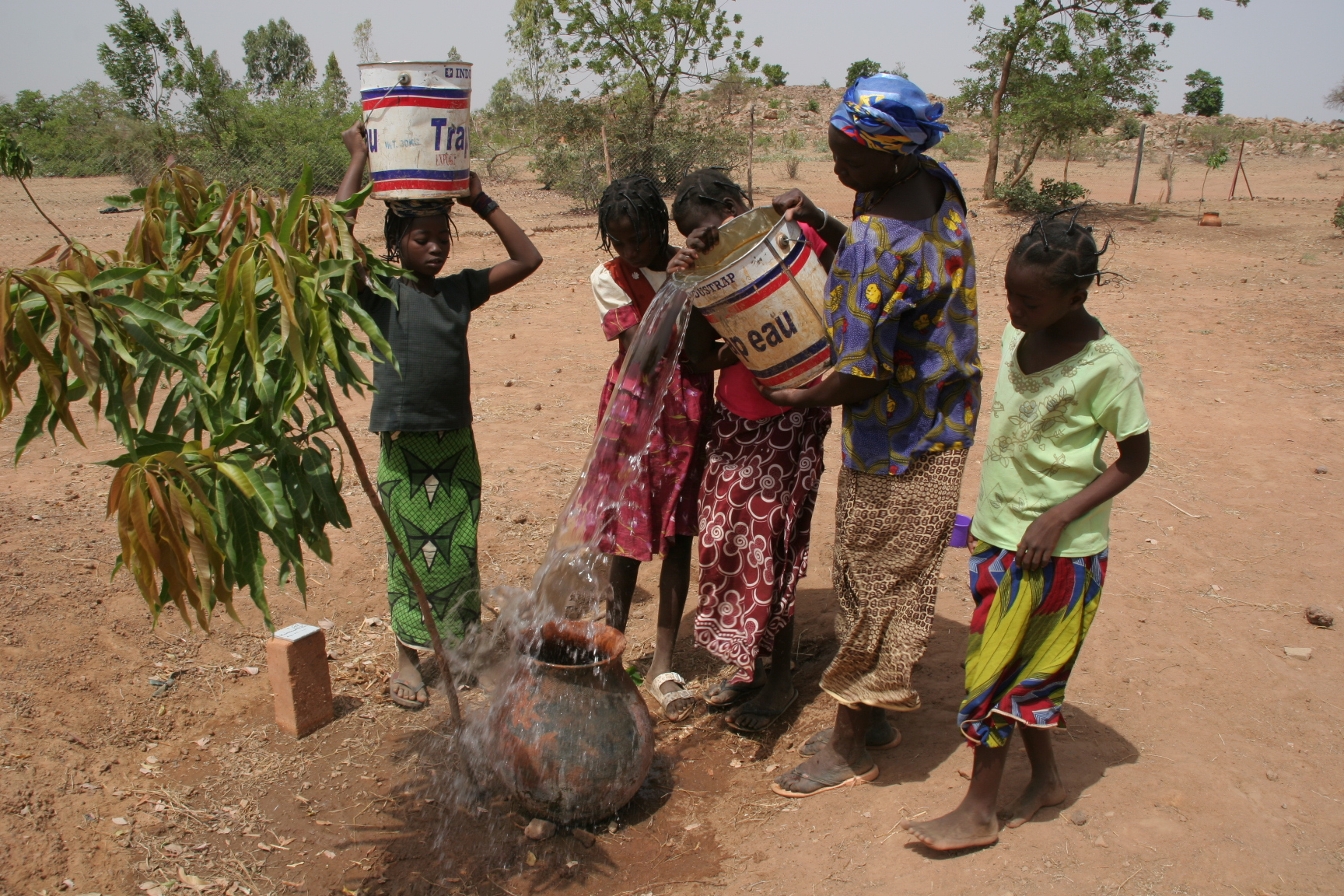
Mango farmers

As of 2007, there were 583.9 km (362.8 mi) of highways, 142.7 km (88.7 mi) of regional roads and 214.2 km (133.1 mi) of county roads. The first set of car traffic was 28, first set of two-wheeler traffic was 2,258 and the total classified road network was 941. The total corn produced during 2015 was 78,512 tonnes, cotton was 43,308 tonnes, cowpea was 45,678 tonnes, ground nut was 42,492 tonnes, millet was 42,342 tonnes, rice was 66,104 tonnes and sorghum was 118,227 tonnes. The coverage of cereal need compared with the total production of the region was 158.00 per cent.

== Infrastructure ==
=== Water supply and sanitation ===
A study that investigated water security of households and women's vulnerability to climate-related risks in the Nouaho sub-basin in 2021 found that "Water was described as inadequate every year between November and June, and respondents perceived lower water availability during the dry season compared with 10–20 years ago due to changes in climate, migrants to the area, growing populations, and increased numbers of animals."

There are usually long wait times for people (mainly women) who are collecting water from improved water sources (boreholes with hand pumps). The travel and wait time for collecting water from boreholes was about twice as long in the dry season (70 minutes round trip) compared to the rainy season (36 minutes). Dug wells are also used but have a poorer water quality.

The area has water user associations to manage the operation and maintenance of boreholes and to interact with local authorities. They charge an annual fee to their users "ranging from 500–1000 CFA (1-2 USD) for women and 1000–2000 CFA (2-4 USD) for men, as well as fees for children and animals in some cases".

Sanitation facilities are very poor in the Nouaho sub-basin, with around 66% of the population using open defecation instead of toilets (as of 2021).

== Local administration ==
Burkina Faso gained independence from France in 1960. It was originally called Upper Volta. There have been military coups until 1983 when Captain Thomas Sankara took control and implemented radical left wing policies. He was ousted by Blaise Compaore, who continued for 27 years until 2014, when a popular uprising ended his rule.

As per Law No.40/98/AN in 1998, Burkina Faso adhered to decentralization to provide administrative and financial autonomy to local communities. There are 13 administrative regions, each governed by a Governor. The regions are subdivided into 45 provinces, which are further subdivided into 351 communes. The communes may be urban or rural and are interchangeable. There are other administrative entities like department and village. An urban commune has typically 10,000 people under it. If any commune is not able to get 75 per cent of its planned budget in revenues for three years, the autonomy is taken off. The communes are administered by elected Mayors. The communes are stipulated to develop economic, social and cultural values of its citizens. A commune has financial autonomy and can interact with other communes, government agencies or international entities.
