= Ouargaye =

- Location within Burkina Faso, French West Africa
- Coordinates: 11°30′N 0°30′E
- Country: Burkina Faso

Population (2019 census)
  - Total: 13,431
- Time zone: UTC+0 (GMT)
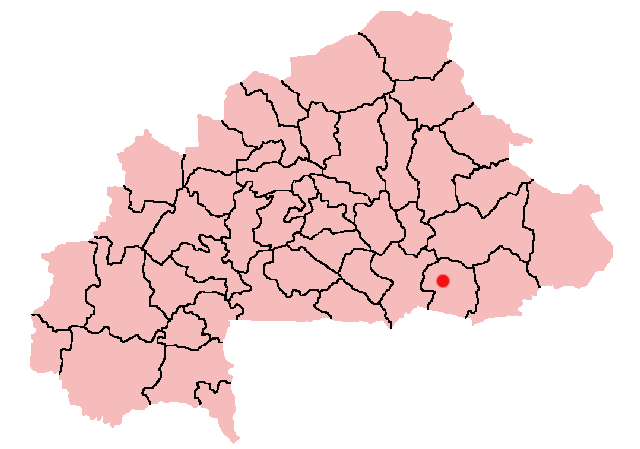
- Location of Ouargaye in Burkina Faso

Ouargaye is a town located in the province of Koulpélogo in Burkina Faso. It is the capital of Koulpélogo Province. Ouargaye is twinned with Fougères in Brittany, France.
