= Clarence Darrow =

American lawyer and politician (1857–1938)

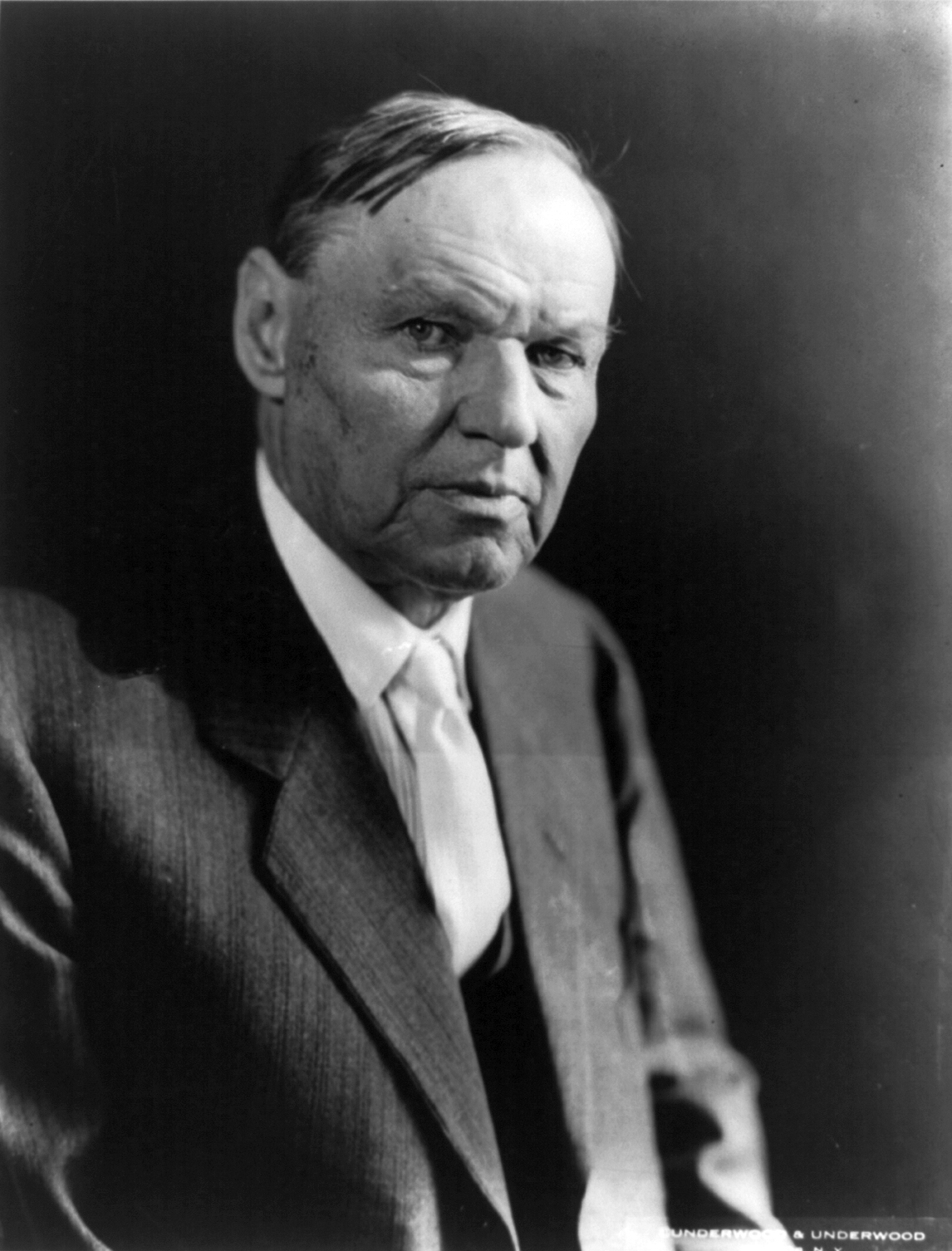
- Darrow in 1913

Member of the Illinois House of Representatives from the 17th district
- In office January 7, 1903 – January 4, 1905
- Preceded by: Albert Glade
- Succeeded by: Edward W. Gillispie

Personal details
- Born: Clarence Seward Darrow; April 18, 1857 Farmdale, Ohio, U.S.
- Died: March 13, 1938 (aged 80) Chicago, Illinois, U.S.
- Party: Independent
- Other political affiliations: Public Ownership (1903–1905)
- Spouses: Jessie Ohl (m. 1880; div. 1897) Ruby Hammerstrom (m. 1903)
- Children: 1
- Relatives: J. Howard Moore (brother-in-law); Karl K. Darrow (nephew)
- Occupation: Lawyer

Clarence Seward Darrow (April 18, 1857 – March 13, 1938) was an American lawyer and politician who became famous in the 19th century for high-profile representations of trade union causes, and in the 20th century for several criminal matters, including the Leopold and Loeb murder trial, the Scopes "monkey" trial, and the Ossian Sweet defense. He was a leading member of the American Civil Liberties Union and a prominent advocate for numerous Populist causes, as well as a noted public speaker, debater, and writer.

Darrow is considered by some legal analysts and lawyers to be the greatest lawyer of the 20th century. He was posthumously inducted into the Trial Lawyer Hall of Fame. Called a "sophisticated country lawyer," Darrow's wit and eloquence made him one of the most prominent attorneys and civil libertarians in the nation.

== Early life and education ==
Clarence Darrow was born in the small town of Farmdale, Ohio, on April 18, 1857, the fifth son of Amirus and Emily Darrow (née Eddy). He grew up in nearby Kinsman, Ohio. Both the Darrow and Eddy families had deep roots in colonial New England, and several of Darrow's ancestors served in the American Revolution. Darrow's father was an ardent abolitionist, a proud iconoclast and religious freethinker. He was known throughout the town as the "village infidel." Emily Darrow was an early supporter of female suffrage and a women's rights advocate.

The young Clarence attended Allegheny College in Pennsylvania and the University of Michigan Law School, but did not graduate from either institution. He attended Allegheny College for only one year before the Panic of 1873 struck, and Darrow was determined not to be a financial burden to his father any longer. Over the next three years he taught in the winter at the district school in a country community.

While teaching, Darrow also started to study the law on his own, and by the end of his third year of teaching, he was urged by his family to enter the law department at Ann Arbor. Darrow studied there for only a year when he decided that it would be much more cost-effective to read law in an actual law office. When he felt that he was ready, he took the Ohio bar exam and passed. He was admitted to the Ohio bar in 1878, where he continued to practice. The Clarence Darrow Octagon House, his childhood home in Kinsman, contains a memorial to him.

== Legal career ==
Following his departure from the University of Michigan Law School in late 1879, Darrow moved to the small village of Harvard, Illinois, with his classmate L.H. Stafford, who was from Harvard. It was in the McHenry County Courthouse that Darrow successfully tried one of his first cases in January 1880. Soon after, Darrow decided to return to Ohio and opened a law office in Andover, Ohio, a small farming town just ten miles (16 kilometers) from Kinsman. Having little experience, he started off slowly and gradually built up his career by dealing with the everyday complaints and problems of a farming community. After two years Darrow felt he was ready to take on new and different cases and moved his practice to Ashtabula, Ohio, which had a population of 5,000 people and was the largest city in the county. There he became involved in Democratic Party politics and served as the town counsel.

In 1880, he married Jessie Ohl, and eight years later he moved to Chicago with his wife and young son, Paul. He did not have much business when he first moved to Chicago, and spent as little as possible. He joined the Henry George Club and made some friends and connections in the city. Being part of the club also gave him an opportunity to speak for the Democratic Party on the upcoming election. He slowly made a name for himself through these speeches, eventually earning the standing to speak in whatever hall he liked. He was offered work as an attorney for the city of Chicago. Darrow worked in the city law department for two years (Note: worked as special assessment attorney for city in 1889, worked as corporation counsel in 1890) when he resigned and took a position as a lawyer at the Chicago and North-Western Railway Company in 1891. In 1894, Darrow represented Eugene V. Debs, the leader of the American Railway Union, who was prosecuted by the federal government for leading the Pullman Strike of 1894. Darrow severed his ties with the railroad to represent Debs, making a financial sacrifice. He saved Debs in one trial but could not keep him from being jailed in another.

Also in 1894, Darrow took on the first murder case of his career, defending Patrick Eugene Prendergast, the "mentally deranged drifter" who had confessed to murdering Chicago mayor Carter Harrison III. Darrow's insanity defense of Prendergast failed and he was executed. Among fifty defenses in murder cases in Darrow's career, the Prendergast case was the only one that resulted in an execution, though Darrow did not join the defense team until after Prendergast's conviction, in an effort to spare him the noose.

=== Work as a labor lawyer ===
Darrow soon became one of America's leading labor attorneys. He helped organize the Populist Party in Illinois and then ran for U.S. Congress as a Democrat in 1895 but lost to Hugh R. Belknap. In 1897, his marriage to Jessie Ohl ended in divorce. He joined the Anti-Imperialist League in 1898 in opposition to the U.S. annexation of the Philippines. He represented the woodworkers of Wisconsin in a notable case in Oshkosh in 1898 and the United Mine Workers in Pennsylvania in the great anthracite coal strike of 1902. His former mentor, Governor John Peter Altgeld, joined Darrow's firm after his Chicago mayoral electoral defeat in 1899 and worked with Darrow until his death in 1902. Darrow flirted with the idea of running for mayor of Chicago in 1903, but he ultimately decided against it. In July of that year, he married Ruby Hammerstrom, a young Chicago journalist. From 1903 to 1911, Darrow was partners in the firm of Darrow, Masters and Wilson with Edgar Lee Masters, who became a famous poet, and Francis S. Wilson, who later served as Chief Justice of the Illinois Supreme Court.

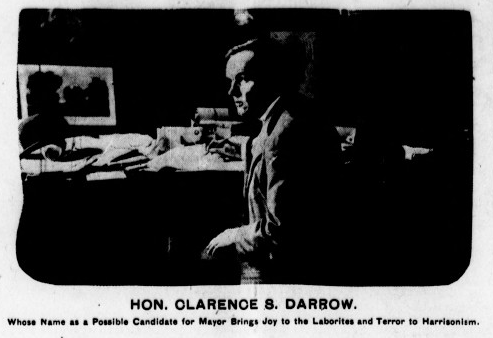
Clarence Darrow in 1902

From 1906 through 1908, Darrow represented the Western Federation of Miners leaders William "Big Bill" Haywood, Charles Moyer, and George Pettibone when they were arrested and charged with conspiring to murder former Idaho Governor Frank Steunenberg in 1905. Haywood and Pettibone were acquitted in separate trials, and the charges against Moyer were then dropped.

In 1911, the American Federation of Labor (AFL) called on Darrow to defend the McNamara brothers, John and James, who were charged in the Los Angeles Times bombing on October 1, 1910, during the bitter struggle over the open shop in Southern California. The bomb had been placed in an alley behind the building, and although the explosion itself did not bring the building down, it ignited nearby ink barrels and natural gas main lines. In the ensuing fire, 20 people were killed. The AFL appealed to local, state, regional and national unions to donate 25 cents per capita to the defense fund, and set up defense committees in larger cities throughout the nation to accept donations.

In the weeks before the jury was seated, Darrow became increasingly concerned about the outcome of the trial and began negotiations for a plea bargain to spare the defendants' lives. During the weekend of November 19–20, 1911, he discussed with pro-labor journalist Lincoln Steffens and newspaper publisher E.W. Scripps the possibility of reaching out to the Times about the terms of a plea agreement. The prosecution had demands of its own, however, including an admission of guilt in open court and longer sentences than the defense proposed.

The defense's position weakened when, on November 28, Darrow was accused of orchestrating to bribe a prospective juror. The juror reported the offer to police, who set up a sting and observed the defense team's chief investigator, Bert Franklin, delivering $4,000 to the juror two blocks away from Darrow's office. After making payment, Franklin walked one block in the direction of Darrow's office before being arrested right in front of Darrow himself, who had just walked to that very intersection after receiving a phone call in his office. With Darrow himself on the verge of being discredited, the defense's hope for a simple plea agreement ended. On December 1, 1911, the McNamara brothers changed their pleas to guilty, in open court. The plea bargain Darrow helped arrange earned John fifteen years and James life imprisonment. Despite sparing the brothers the death penalty, Darrow was accused by many in organized labor of selling the movement out.

Two months later, Darrow was charged with two counts of attempting to bribe jurors in both cases. He faced two lengthy trials. In the first, defended by Earl Rogers and was ultimately acquitted. When Rogers became ill during the second trial and rarely came to court, Darrow represented himself for the remainder of the proceedings. The trial ended with a hung jury.

A deal was later struck in which the district attorney agreed not to retry Darrow if he promised not to practice law again in California. Darrow's early biographers, Irving Stone and Arthur and Lila Weinberg, argued that he was not involved in the bribery conspiracy. However, more recent authors, including Geoffrey Cowan and John A. Farrell, concluded based on newly uncovered evidence that Darrow almost certainly was involved. In the biography of Earl Rogers by his daughter Adela Rogers St. Johns wrote: "I never had any doubts, even before one of my father's private conversations with Darrow included an admission of guilt to his lawyer."

=== Transition to criminal lawyer ===
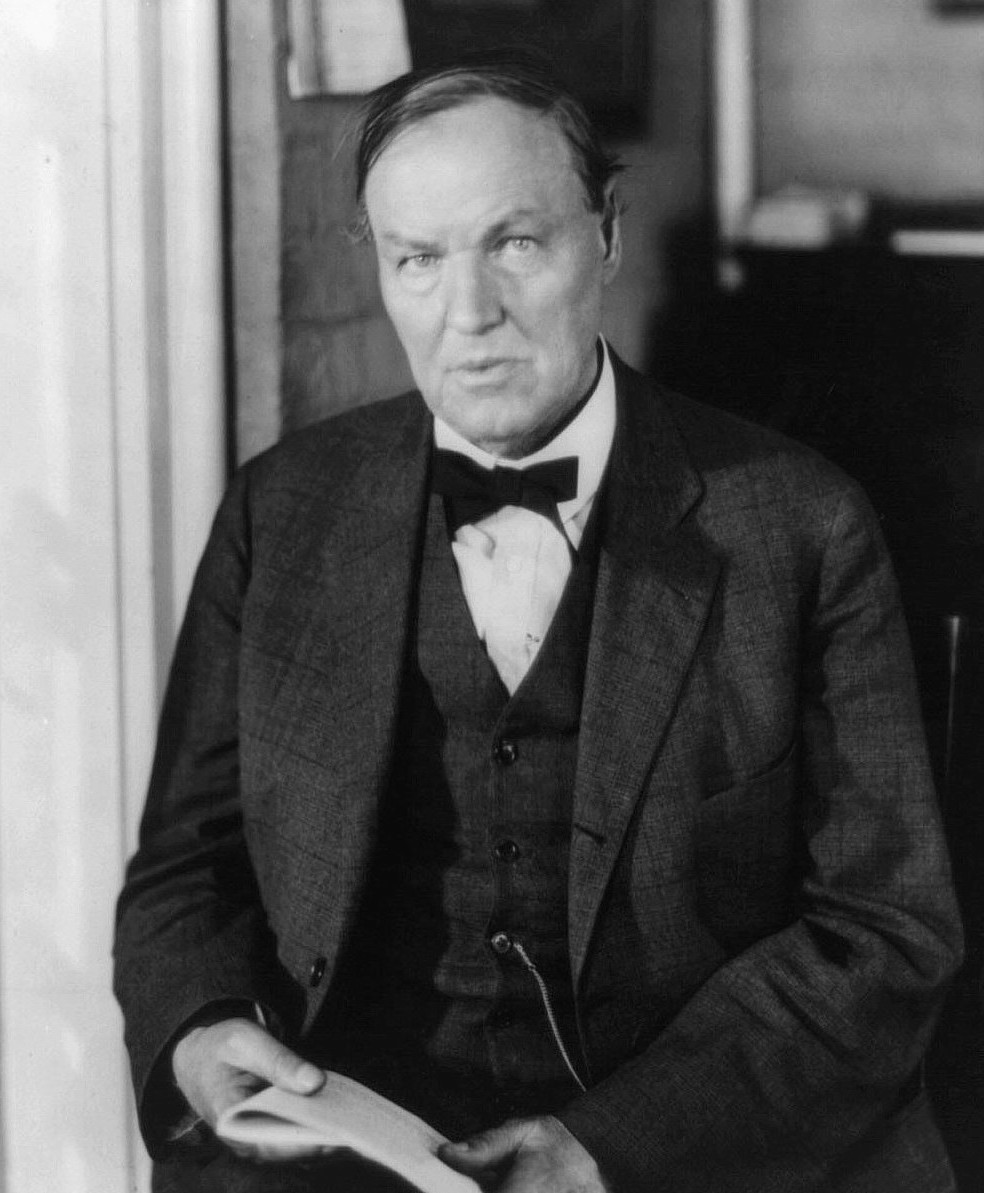
Darrow in 1922

As a consequence of the bribery charges, most labor unions dropped Darrow from their list of preferred attorneys. This effectively ended his career as a labor lawyer, and he switched to civil and criminal cases. He took the latter because he had become convinced that the criminal justice system could ruin people's lives if they were not adequately represented.

Throughout his career, Darrow devoted himself to opposing the death penalty, which he felt was incompatible with humanitarian progress. In more than 100 cases, only one of Darrow's clients was executed.

=== National renown ===
==== Leopold and Loeb ====
In the summer of 1924, Darrow took on the case of Nathan Leopold Jr. and Richard Loeb, the teenage sons of two wealthy Chicago families who were accused of kidnapping and killing Bobby Franks, a 14-year-old boy, from their stylish southside Kenwood neighborhood. Leopold was a law student at the University of Chicago about to transfer to Harvard Law School, and Loeb was the youngest graduate ever from the University of Michigan; they were 19 and 18, respectively, when they were arrested. When asked why they committed the crime, Leopold told his captors: "The thing that prompted Dick to want to do this thing and prompted me to want to do this thing was a sort of pure love of excitement ... the imaginary love of thrills, doing something different ... the satisfaction and the ego of putting something over."

Chicago newspapers labeled the case the "Trial of the Century" and Americans around the country wondered what could drive the two young men, blessed with everything their society could offer, to commit such a depraved act. The killers had been arrested after a passing workman spotted the victim's body in an isolated nature preserve near the Indiana border just half a day after it was hidden, before they could collect a $10,000 ransom. Nearby were Leopold's eyeglasses with their distinctive, traceable frames, which he had dropped at the scene.

Leopold and Loeb made full confessions and took police on a hunt around Chicago to collect the evidence that would be used against them. The state's attorney told the press that he had a "hanging case" for sure. Darrow stunned the prosecution when he had his clients plead guilty in order to avoid a vengeance-minded jury and place the case before a judge. The trial, then, was actually a long sentencing hearing in which Darrow contended, with the help of expert testimony, that Leopold and Loeb were mentally diseased.

Darrow's closing argument lasted 12 hours. He repeatedly stressed the ages of the "boys" (before the Vietnam War, the age of majority was 21) and noted that "never had there been a case in Chicago where on a plea of guilty a boy under 21 had been sentenced to death." His plea was designed to soften the heart of Judge John Caverly, but also to mold public opinion, so that Caverly could follow precedent without too huge an uproar. Darrow succeeded. Caverly sentenced Leopold and Loeb to life in prison plus 99 years. Darrow's closing argument was published in several editions in the late 1920s and early 1930s, and was reissued at the time of his death.

The Leopold and Loeb case raised, in a well-publicized trial, Darrow's lifelong contention that psychological, physical, and environmental influences — not a conscious choice between right and wrong — control human behavior. Darrow's psychiatric expert witnesses testified that both boys "were decidedly deficient in emotion". Darrow later argued that emotion is necessary for the decisions that people make. When someone tries to go against a certain law or custom that is forbidden, he wrote, he should feel a sense of revulsion. As neither Leopold nor Loeb had a working emotional system, they did not feel revolted.

During the trial, the newspapers claimed that Darrow was presenting a "million dollar defense" for the two wealthy families. Many ordinary Americans were angered at his apparent greed. He had the families issue a statement insisting that there would be no large legal fees and that his fees would be determined by a committee composed of officers from the Chicago Bar Association. After trial, Darrow suggested $200,000 would be reasonable. After lengthy negotiations with the defendants' families, he ended up getting some $70,000 in gross fees, which, after expenses and taxes, netted Darrow $30,000, worth over $375,000 in 2016.

==== Scopes trial ====
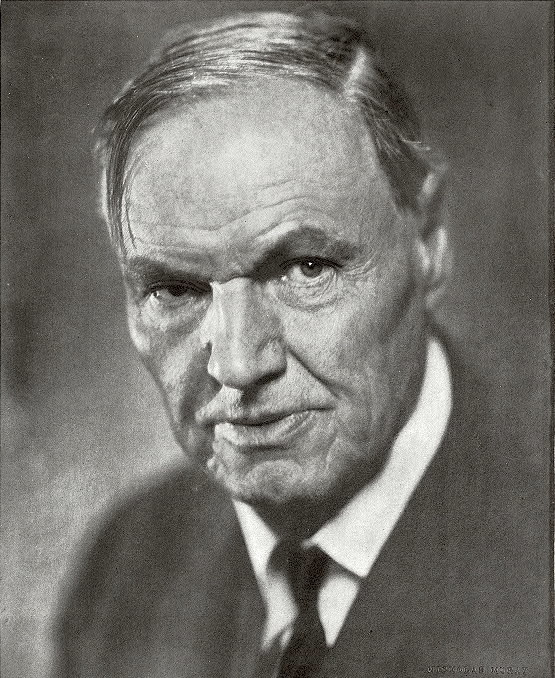
Darrow c. 1925

In 1925, Darrow defended John T. Scopes in the State of Tennessee v. Scopes trial. It has often been called the "Scopes Monkey Trial," a title popularized by author and journalist H. L. Mencken. The trial, which was deliberately staged to bring publicity to the issue at hand, pitted Darrow against William Jennings Bryan in a court case that tested Tennessee's Butler Act, which had been passed on March 21, 1925. The act forbade the teaching of "the Evolution Theory" in any state-funded educational establishment. More broadly, it outlawed in state-funded schools (including universities) the teaching of "any theory that denies the story of the Divine Creation of man as taught in the Bible, and to teach instead that man has descended from a lower order of animals."

During the trial, Darrow requested that Bryan be called to the stand as an expert witness on the Bible. Over the other prosecutor's objection, Bryan agreed. Popular media at the time portrayed the following exchange as the deciding factor that turned public opinion against Bryan in the trial:

Darrow: "You have given considerable study to the Bible, haven't you, Mr. Bryan?"
Bryan: "Yes, sir; I have tried to.... But, of course, I have studied it more as I have become older than when I was a boy."
Darrow: "Do you claim then that everything in the Bible should be literally interpreted?"
Bryan: "I believe that everything in the Bible should be accepted as it is given there; some of the Bible is given illustratively. For instance: 'Ye are the salt of the earth.' I would not insist that man was actually salt, or that he had flesh of salt, but it is used in the sense of salt as saving God's people."

After about two hours, Judge John T. Raulston cut the questioning short and on the following morning ordered that the whole session (which in any case the jury had not witnessed) be expunged from the record, ruling that the testimony had no bearing on whether Scopes was guilty of teaching evolution. Scopes was found guilty and ordered to pay the minimum fine of $100.

A year later, the Tennessee Supreme Court reversed the decision of the Dayton court on a procedural technicality — not on constitutional grounds, as Darrow had hoped. According to the court, the fine should have been set by the jury, not Raulston. Rather than send the case back for further action, however, the Tennessee Supreme Court dismissed the case. The court commented, "Nothing is to be gained by prolonging the life of this bizarre case."

The event led to a change in public sentiment and an increased discourse on the creation claims of religious teachers versus those of secular scientists — i.e., creationism compared to evolutionism — that still exists. It also became popularized in a play based loosely on the trial, Inherit the Wind, which has been adapted several times on film and television.

==== Ossian Sweet ====
On September 9, 1925, a white mob in Detroit attempted to drive a Black family out of the home they had purchased in a white neighborhood. During the struggle, a white man was killed, and the eleven Black people in the house were later arrested and charged with murder. Ossian Sweet, a doctor, and three members of his family were brought to trial, and after an initial deadlock, Darrow argued to the all-white jury: "I insist that there is nothing but prejudice in this case; that if it was reversed and eleven white men had shot and killed a Black man while protecting their home and their lives against a mob of Blacks, nobody would have dreamed of having them indicted. They would have been given medals instead...."

Following a mistrial, it was agreed that each of the eleven defendants would be tried individually. Darrow, alongside Thomas Chawke, would first defend Ossian's brother Henry, who had confessed to firing the shot on Garland Street. Henry was found not guilty on grounds of self-defense, and the prosecution determined to drop the charges on the remaining ten. The trials were presided over by Frank Murphy, who went on to become Governor of Michigan and an Associate Justice of the Supreme Court of the United States.

Darrow's closing statement, which lasted over seven hours, is seen as a landmark in the civil rights movement and was included in the book Speeches that Changed the World (given the name "I Believe in the Law of Love"). The two closing arguments delivered by Darrow, from the first and second trials, show how he learned from the first trial and reshaped his remarks.

==== Massie trial ====
The Scopes trial and the Sweet trial were the last big cases that Darrow took on before he retired from full-time practice at the age of 68. He still took on a few cases such as the 1932 Massie Trial in Hawaii.

In his last headline-making case, the Massie Trial, Darrow, devastated by the Great Depression, was hired by Eva Stotesbury, the wife of Darrow's old family friend Edward T. Stotesbury, to come to the defense of Grace Fortescue, Edward J. Lord, Deacon Jones, and Thomas Massie, Fortescue's son-in-law, who were accused of murdering Joseph Kahahawai. Kahahawai had been accused, along with four other men, of raping and beating Thalia Massie, Thomas's wife and Fortescue's daughter. Fortescue and Massie were accused of orchestrating the murder of Kahahawai in order to extract a confession and were caught by police officers while transporting his dead body.

Darrow entered the racially charged atmosphere as the lawyer for the defendants. He reconstructed the case as a justified honor killing by Thomas Massie. Considered by The New York Times to be one of Darrow's three most compelling trials (along with the Scopes Trial and the Leopold and Loeb case), the case captivated the nation and most of America strongly supported the honor killing defense. In fact, the final defense arguments were transmitted to the mainland through a special radio hookup. In the end, the jury came back with a unanimous verdict of guilty, but on the lesser crime of manslaughter. Darrow attributed the guilty verdict to the racially mixed nature of the jury, claiming that, "A jury of white men would have acquitted". As to Darrow's closing, one juror commented, "[h]e talked to us like a bunch of farmers. That stuff may go over big in the Middle West, but not here." Governor Lawrence Judd later commuted the sentences to one hour in his office. Years later Deacon admitted to shooting Kahahawai; Kahahawai was found not guilty in a posthumous trial.

== Religious beliefs ==
=== "Why I Am An Agnostic" ===
As part of a public symposium on belief held in Columbus, Ohio, in 1929, Darrow delivered a speech, later titled "Why I Am An Agnostic", on agnosticism, skepticism, belief, and religion. In the speech, Darrow thoroughly discussed the meaning of being an agnostic and questioned the doctrines of Christianity and the Bible. He concluded that "the fear of God is not the beginning of wisdom. The fear of God is the death of wisdom. Skepticism and doubt lead to study and investigation, and investigation is the beginning of wisdom."

=== Mecca Temple debate ===
In January 1931 Darrow had a debate with English writer G. K. Chesterton during the latter's second trip to America. This was held at New York City's Mecca Temple. The topic was "Will the World Return to Religion?". At the end of the debate those in the hall were asked to vote for the man they thought had won the debate. Darrow received 1,022 votes while Chesterton received 2,359 votes. There is no known transcript of what was said except for third party accounts published later on. The earliest of these was in the February 4, 1931, issue of The Nation in an article written by Henry Hazlitt.

=== Position on eugenics ===
In the edition of November 18, 1915, of The Washington Post, Darrow stated: "Chloroform unfit children. Show them the same mercy that is shown beasts that are no longer fit to live." However, Darrow was also critical of some eugenics advocates.

By the 1920s, the eugenics movement was very powerful and Darrow was a pointed critic of that movement. In the years immediately before the Supreme Court of the United States would endorse eugenics through Buck v. Bell, Darrow wrote multiple essays criticizing the illogic of the eugenicists, especially the confirmation bias in eugenicist arguments.

In a 1925 essay, "The Edwardses and the Jukeses", he imitated the eugenicists' tracking of pedigrees as a way to demonstrate that their retrospective centuries-long family tree studies were omitting literally thousands of relatives whose lives did not support the researchers' preconceptions. Eugenicist arguments about the eminent Edwards family (of the theologian Jonathan Edwards) ignored that family's mediocre relatives, and even ignored some immediately related murderers. Eugenicist arguments about the Jukes family did just the opposite, leaving ignored or untraced many functional and law-abiding relatives.

In Darrow's subsequent essay, "The Eugenics Cult" (1926), he attacked the reasoning of eugenicists. "On the basis of what biological principles, and by what psychological hocus-pocus [Dr. William McDougall] reaches the conclusion that the ability to read intelligently denotes a good germ-plasm and desirable citizens I cannot say," he wrote. Darrow also criticized the idea that humanity knows what qualities it would take to make humanity "better," and compared humanity's biology experiments unfavorably to those of Nature.

== Political career ==
Darrow was well-involved in Chicago's Democratic politics. In the 1903 Chicago mayoral election there was a strong push by members of the Chicago Federation of Labor and others to draft Darrow as a third-party candidate. Darrow considered accepting, and even seemed prepared to announce his candidacy, but ultimately declined to run. Darrow served in the Illinois House of Representatives from the 17th district during the 43rd General Assembly as one of two members of the Public Ownership Party along with John J. McManaman. He was elected on a platform "advocating the municipal ownership of public utilities."

Darrow was appointed in 1905 by newly elected Chicago mayor Edward Fitzsimmons Dunne to serve in the position of "Special Traction Counsel to the Mayor", assisting Dunne in his attempts to resolve the city's traction problem. He and Dunne had presented two plans to the Chicago City Council, both of which it rejected. Darrow resigned his position in November 1905.

== Personal life and death ==
Darrow married Jessie Ohl in April 1880. They had one child. He was Clarence Darrow's only child. Clarence and Jessie divorced in 1897. In July 1903, he married Ruby Hammerstrom, a journalist 16 years his junior. Clarence Darrow died on March 13, 1938, at his home in Chicago, of pulmonary heart disease.

== Legacy ==
Darrow is remembered as a trial attorney who often championed the underdog, earning him a reputation as one of the greatest criminal defense lawyers in American history.

Henry Drummond (left), a fictionalized version of Clarence Darrow, as portrayed by Spencer Tracy in Inherit the Wind

According to legend, before he died, Darrow declared that if there was an afterlife, he would return on the small bridge (now known as the Clarence Darrow Memorial Bridge) located just south of the Museum of Science and Industry in Hyde Park, Chicago on the date of his death. Darrow was skeptical of a belief in life after death (he is reported to have said: "Every man knows when his life began... If I did not exist in the past, why should I, or could I, exist in the future?") but he made this promise to dissuade mediums from charging people money to "talk" to his spirit. People still gather on the bridge in the hope of seeing his ghost.

=== Plays ===
- Compulsion, 1957 play based on Meyer Levin's novel of the same name, produced on Broadway with Dean Stockwell as "Judd Steiner", Roddy McDowall as "Artie Strauss" and Michael Constantine as "Jonathan Wilk". The basis for the 1959 film adaptation, in which Dean Stockwell reprised his role from the Broadway production.
- Clarence Darrow (1974), a full-length one-man play by David W. Rintels created after Darrow's death, featuring Darrow's reminiscences about his career. Originated by Henry Fonda, many actors (including Leslie Nielsen, David Canary and Kevin Spacey) have since taken on the role of Darrow in this play.
- Inherit the Wind, a play (later adapted to the screen) that is a broadly fictionalized account of the Scopes Trial. Though the authors noted that the 1925 trial was "clearly the genesis" of their play, they insisted the characters had a "life and language of their own." They also mention that the issues raised in the play "have acquired new dimension and meaning", a possible reference to the political controversies of the 1950s. Still, they finished their foreword by inviting a more universal reading of the play: "It might have been yesterday. It could be tomorrow." Spencer Tracy played the Darrow character ("Henry Drummond") in the film, and Jason Robards played him in a TV remake in 1988.
- Malice Aforethought: The Sweet Trials is a play written by Arthur Beer, based on the trials of Ossian and Henry Sweet, and derived from Kevin Boyle's Arc of Justice.
- My Name is Ossian Sweet, a docudrama written by Gordon C. Bennett, based on the Sweet trials in which the black family was defended by Darrow against a charge of murder in Detroit 1925. Published (2011) at HeartlandPlays.com.
- Clarence Darrow Tonight! written and performed by Laurence Luckinbill, debuted at The Ensemble Theater in NYC and performed throughout the country, including at President Bill Clinton's second inaugural in 1996. Winner of the 1996 Silver Gavel Award for Theater, given by the American Bar Association.

=== Film and television ===
- During an interrogation at the police station in the 1949 movie Holiday Affair, Connie Ennis (Janet Leigh) says to the lieutenant (Harry Morgan), "Your honor, I think I can clear this all up." The lieutenant replies, "Go ahead, if Clarence Darrow here doesn't have any objections." (He is referring to her fiancé Carl Davis, played by Wendell Corey).
- Compulsion, 1959 film. Fictionalized account of the Leopold and Loeb trial. Orson Welles played the role of defense attorney Jonathan Wilk, based on Darrow. Welles, whose plea to the judge for mercy for his clients was the longest monologue ever committed to film at the time, shared the Best Actor award with co-stars Bradford Dillman and Dean Stockwell at that year's Cannes Film Festival.
- The episode, "Defendant: Clarence Darrow" (January 13, 1963), with Tol Avery playing Darrow, in the CBS anthology series GE True, hosted by Jack Webb. In the storyline, Darrow is charged in 1912 with attempted bribery of a juror. He is defended by Earl Rogers, played by Robert Vaughn. Darrow and Rogers argue passionately over legal procedures.
- Clarence Darrow (1974), a videotaped television production of the David W. Rintels one-person play, starring Henry Fonda as Darrow.
- Darrow (1991), television film starring Kevin Spacey as Darrow, broadcast on American Playhouse.
- Alleged (2010), starring Brian Dennehy as Darrow and Fred Thompson as William Jennings Bryan.

=== Publications ===
==== Non-fiction ====
External videos
- Presentation by John Farrell on Clarence Darrow: Attorney for the Damned, July 14, 2011, C-SPAN
- Presentation by Farrell on Clarence Darrow, September 23, 2012, C-SPAN

- "Attorney for the Damned" (Arthur Weinberg, ed), published by University of Chicago Press in 2012; Simon and Schuster in 1957; provides Darrow's most influential summations and includes scene-setting explanations and comprehensive notes; on NYT best seller list 19 weeks.
- Clarence Darrow: Attorney for the Damned by John A. Farrell, published by Doubleday in June 2011; includes material opened to the public in June 2010 by the University of Minnesota Law Library through the Clarence Darrow Digital collection
- Arc of Justice (Owl Books, 2004) by Kevin Boyle; in-depth look at the Ossian Sweet trial
- Clarence Darrow for the Defense, a biography by historical novelist Irving Stone
- The People v. Clarence Darrow (ISBN 978-0-8129-2179-3) by Geoffrey Cowan; the history of the California criminal case against Darrow for attempting to bribe a juror while defending the McNamara brothers, two labor organizers accused of planting a bomb which destroyed the printing plant of the Los Angeles Times and killed 21 workers.
- "Is Religion Necessary" (Haldeman-Julius Publications); a transcript of the debate between Clarence Darrow and Rev. Robert MacGovern, 1931.

==== Fiction ====
- Compulsion, a 1956 novel by Meyer Levin, is a dramatic retelling of the Leopold and Loeb case in which Darrow served as the basis for the character of Jonathan Wilk. The novel was adapted as a film of the same name in 1959 starring Orson Welles as Wilk.
- Damned in Paradise, a 1996 Nate Heller novel by Max Allan Collins, renders a fictionalized account of the Massie Trial.
- The Angel of Darkness, a 1997 novel by Caleb Carr, features Darrow in a supporting role.

=== Other ===
- The Clarence Darrow Memorial Bridge is located in Chicago, just south of the Museum of Science & Industry. The Clarence Darrow Commemorative Committee holds an annual event to honor Darrow's life and work.
- The complete collection of Clarence Darrow's personal papers is housed at the University of Minnesota Libraries.
- Darrow is mentioned in "The Gift", a 1967 song by Lou Reed as performed by The Velvet Underground on their 1968 album White Light/White Heat.
- The chapter of Phi Alpha Delta law fraternity located at the University of Maryland Carey School of Law is named the Clarence Darrow Chapter.
- A statue of Darrow stands outside the Rhea County Courthouse in Dayton, Tennessee, site of the 1925 Scopes Trial. The statue was erected on July 14, 2017, and stands just a few feet away from a statue of Darrow's Scopes Trial opponent, William Jennings Bryan, erected in 2005.
- Darrow was reported to have distracted juries during the closing arguments of his opponents with a cigar trick. He allegedly inserted a thin piano wire into his cigar, which he lit up in the courtroom, to prevent the cigar ash from falling. The jury was reportedly distracted by the fact that the ashes, held together by the wire, never fell from Darrow's cigar.
- Darrow was briefly mentioned in an episode of the award-winning drama series Breaking Bad.

== Bibliography ==
- A Persian Pearl and Other Essays. Roycroft Shop, 1899, OCLC 5041099.
- Realism in Literature and Art. Charles H. Kerr & Co., 1899, OCLC 7725115.
- The Skeleton in the Closet. Haldeman-Julius Co., 1899, LCCN 00-537200.
- Resist Not Evil. Haldeman-Julius Co., 1902, LCCN 00-537204.
- Crime & Criminals: An Address Delivered to the Prisoners in the Chicago County Jail. Charles H. Kerr & Co., 1902, LCCN 61-57022.
- In Memory of John P. Altgeld: Address at the Funeral. Charles H. Kerr & Co., 1902, LCCN 61-57040.
- Farmington: A Story of Childhood. A. C. McClurg & Co., 1904, LCCN 04-25700.
- The Open Shop. Hammersmark Publishing Co., 1904, OCLC 13492599.
- An Eye for an Eye: A Story of Punishment or Vengeance. Fox, Duffield & Co., 1905, OCLC 3147348.
- Marx versus Tolstoy: A Debate. Charles H. Kerr & Co., 1911, LCCN 73-137537. Co-written with Arthur M. Lewis.
- Industrial Conspiracies. Turner, Newman and Knispel, 1912, OCLC 33185833.
- Plea of Clarence Darrow in His Own Defense to the Jury at Los Angeles, August, 1912. Golden Press, 1912, LCCN 12-22140.
- Argument of Clarence Darrow in the Case of the Communist Labor Party in the Criminal Court, Chicago. Charles H. Kerr & Co., 1920, OCLC 405836.
- Crime: Its Cause and Treatment. Thomas Y. Crowell, 1922, OCLC 373506.
- Insects and Men: Instinct and Reason. Haldeman-Julius Co., 1924, LCCN 00-521999.
- Debate on Capital Punishment: Clarence Darrow, Negative, Judge Alfred J. Talley, Affirmative. Haldeman-Julius Co., 1924, LCCN 00-522000.
- Debate on Prohibition: Clarence Darrow, Negative, John Haynes Holmes, Affirmative. Haldeman-Julius Co., 1924, LCCN 00-537197.
- The Plea of Clarence Darrow: August 22nd, 23rd & 25th, MCMXXIIII, in defense of Richard Loeb and Nathan Leopold, Jr., on trial for murder. Ralph Fletcher Seymour, 1924, LCCN 44-52228.
- The Ordeal of Prohibition. Haldeman-Julius Co., 1925, LCCN 00-537202.
- Crime and the Alarmists. League to Abolish Capital Punishment, 1926, LCCN 00-521991.
- Facing Life Fearlessly: The Pessimistic versus the Optimistic View of Life. Haldeman-Julius Co., 1929, LCCN 2004-574463.
- The Famous Examination of Bryan at the Scopes Evolution Trial. Haldeman-Julius Co., 1929, LCCN 2004-574587.
- The Myth of the Soul. Haldeman-Julius Co., 1929, LCCN 2004-574565.
- Why I Am An Agnostic. Haldeman-Julius Co., 1929, LCCN 2006-576575.
- Absurdities of the Bible. Haldeman-Julius Co., 1931, LCCN 2006-576673.
- The Story of My Life. Charles Scribner's Sons, 1932, LCCN 31-28682.
- Closing Arguments: Clarence Darrow on Religion, Law and Society. Ohio University Press, 2005, ISBN 978-0821416327. Edited by S. T. Joshi.

=== Papers ===
The papers of Clarence Darrow are located at the Library of Congress, and at the University of Minnesota Libraries. The Riesenfeld Rare Books Research Center of the University of Minnesota Law School has the largest collection of Darrow material, including his personal letters. Much of it has been digitized and is available in the law school's Clarence Darrow Digital Collection.

== See also ==
- Curtis Cavielle Taylor, African American lawyer nicknamed "The Black Clarence Darrow"

== References and further reading ==
- Baatz, Simon. For the Thrill of It: Leopold, Loeb and the Murder that Shocked Chicago (New York: HarperCollins, 2008)
- Blum, Howard. American Lightning: Terror, Mystery, the Birth of Hollywood, and the Crime of the Century, 2008, Crown.
- Boyle, Kevin. Arc of Justice: A Saga of Race, Civil Rights and Murder in the Jazz Age (New York: Henry Holt & Co., 2004). (National Book Award Winner) ISBN 978-0-8050-7933-3.
- Farrell, John Aloysius. "Clarence Darrow: Attorney for the Damned". Doubleday, New York: 2011. ISBN 0-385-52258-4.
- Hakim, Joy (1995). War, Peace, and All That Jazz. New York, New York: Oxford University Press. ISBN 0-19-509514-6.
- Haldeman-Julius, Marcet. Clarence Darrow's Two Great Trials: Reports of the Scopes Anti-Evolution Case and the Dr. Sweet Negro Trial. Girard: Haldeman-Julius Co., 1927.
- Mackey, Judge Alfred W. Clarence Darrow biography
- McRae, Donald. The Last Trials of Clarence Darrow (New York: William Morrow publishers, 2009). ISBN 978-0-06-116149-0.
- Morton, Richard Allen (April 2003). "A Victorian Tragedy: The Strange Deaths of Mayor Carter H. Harrison and Patrick Eugene Prendergast". Journal of the Illinois State Historical Society. Archived from the original on October 14, 2007 – via FindArticles.
- Ossian Sweet Murder Trial Scrapbook, 1925. Scrapbook and photocopy of the November 1925 murder trial of Ossian Sweet. Clarke Historical Library, Central Michigan University.
- St. Johns, Adela Rogers: Final Verdict (Doubleday, 1962; biography of Earl Rogers, relating the events of Darrow's trials for jury bribery)
- Stone, Irving. Clarence Darrow for the Defense (Garden City: Doubleday, Doran & Co., 1941).
- Tierney, Kevin. Darrow. A Biography. (New York: Thomas Y. Crowell, 1979). ISBN 0-690-01408-2.
- Toms, Robert. "Speech on the Sweet murder trials upon retirement of the prosecuting attorney in 1960." Clarke Historical Library, Central Michigan University.
- Vine, Phyllis. One Man's Castle: Clarence Darrow in Defense of the American Dream. (New York: Amistad, 2005). ISBN 978-0-06-621415-3.
- Weinberg, Arthur (ed.). Attorney for the Damned: Clarence Darrow in the Courtroom. (University of Chicago Press, 1989) ISBN 978-0-226-13649-3.
- Weinberg, Arthur & Lila. Clarence Darrow: A Sentimental Rebel. Atheneum; 1st Atheneum pbk. ed edition (March 1987)

=== Primary sources ===
- Chicago History Museum: Darrow bibliography (online here).
- Darrow, Clarence. The Story of My Life. New York: Scribner, 1932.
- Darrow, Clarence. In the Clutches of the Law: Clarence Darrow's Letters (ed. Randall Tietjen). Berkeley: UCP, 2013.
- Montefiore, Simon (introd.). Speeches That Changed the World (rev. ed.). London: Quercus, 2014.
- University of Minnesota Law School, . (2022)

"The Oshkosh Woodworkers'Strike of 1898: A Wisconsin Community in Crisis" by Virginia Glenn Crane (1998). Darrow successfully defended strike organizers charged with crimes (State of Wisconsin vs. Kidd, Zentner, and Troiber) with a six-hour closing argument resulting in a jury verdict of "not guilty" at 4:15PM on February 11, 1898,(an important precedent for organized labor in the United States that laborers could not be criminally charged by exercising their right to seek better working conditions).
