= Clarence Darrow Octagon House =

- U.S. National Register of Historic Places
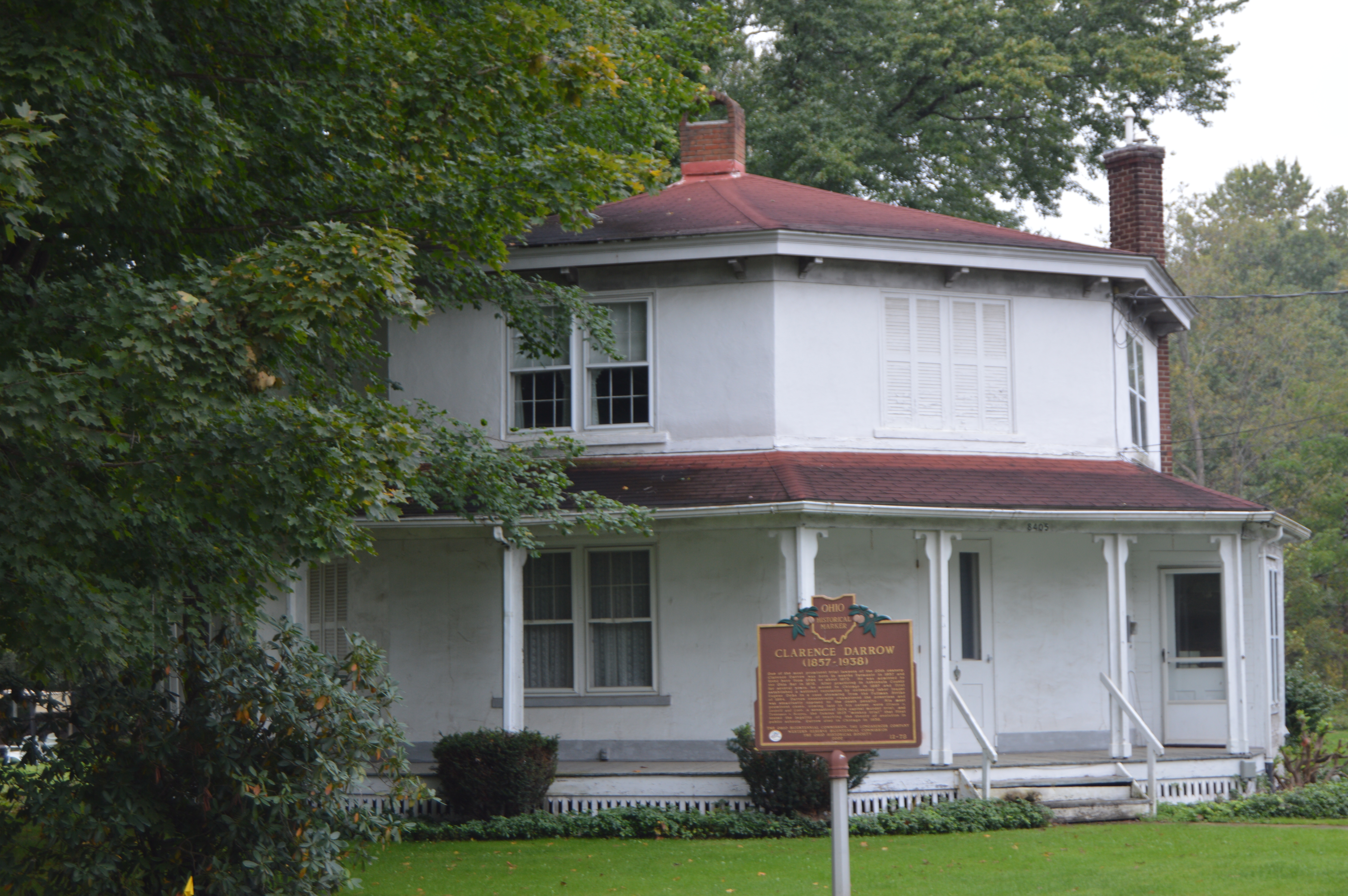
- Roadside view of the house

- Location within Ohio Location within the United States
- Location: State Routes 5 and 7, Kinsman, Ohio
- Coordinates: 41°26′59″N 80°35′4″W
- Area: Less than 1 acre (0.40 ha)
- Built: 1854
- Architectural style: Octagon Mode
- NRHP reference No.: 71001025
- Added to NRHP: September 10, 1971

The Clarence Darrow Octagon House is a historic octagon house in the community of Kinsman, Ohio, United States. Home to lawyer Clarence Darrow in his childhood, it has been named a historic site.

Born in the nearby community of Farmdale, Clarence Darrow was the son of a cabinetmaker. Together with his family, he moved to the octagon house in 1864 at the age of seven and lived in it until the family moved out of state circa 1873. Darrow became a nationally prominent lawyer in his adulthood, and he remembered the octagon house as his home during his most significant childhood years, at a time when his interest in the law was leading him into activities such as running mock trials with his friends. Darrow's final visit to the house occurred in 1936, two years before his death.

Constructed circa 1854, the Darrow House is typical of octagon houses, a short-lived popular passion during the middle of the nineteenth century; its leading proponent, Orson Squire Fowler, advocated their construction as a means of providing superior housing for the poor, and the design allowed for the interior space to be used more efficiently. The Darrow House is primarily a wooden building; the walls are chestnut, with concrete used for chinking. There are seven rooms inside, and much of the original woodworking (for example, the cupboards) survives, as well as the original fireplaces and mantels. The first story of the house is surrounded by a prominent porch, which is absent from only one of the eight sides. Windows are centered in the sides on both stories, and a chimney protrudes from the center.

In September 1971, the Clarence Darrow Octagon House was listed on the National Register of Historic Places, just one week after the same distinction was awarded to Kinsman's Congregational-Presbyterian Church and Dr. Peter Allen House. It is one of seven Ohio octagon houses on the National Register; most were built circa 1860, although "the Octagon" in Tiffin dates from 1852. Unlike the other houses, which qualified for the Register because of their architecture, the Darrow House was deemed eligible solely because of its famous resident. A state historical marker was placed in front of the house in 2000.
