= Thalia Massie =

American socialite (1911–1963)

- Born: Thalia Fortescue; February 14, 1911; Washington, D.C.
- Died: July 3, 1963 (aged 52); Palm Beach, Florida
- Occupation: Socialite
- Spouse(s): Thomas Hedges Massie (m. 1927–1934; div.), Robert Thomlinson Uptigrove (m. 1953–1955; div.)
- Parents: Granville Roland Fortescue (father); Grace Hubbard Fortescue (mother)

Thalia Fortescue Massie (February 14, 1911 – July 3, 1963) was an American member of a socially prominent family, who was involved in a series of heavily publicized trials in Hawaii.

== Life ==
Thalia Fortescue was born February 14, 1911, in Washington, D.C. Her mother was Grace Hubbard Fortescue (1883–1979). Through her mother, she was a grandniece (and cousin twice removed) of Alexander Graham Bell, the inventor of telephone. Her father was Granville Roland Fortescue (1875–1952) who was for propriety's sake called the adopted step-son of the politician Robert Barnwell Roosevelt, but was in fact the biological son of Roosevelt and his mistress (and later wife) Marion Theresa "Minnie" O'Shea. Through her father's family, she was a first cousin once removed of United States President Theodore Roosevelt.

Thaila was oldest of the three daughters born to the couple. Her sisters were Kenyon and Marion. Due to her father's career as a military man and a war correspondent, the family were living in Belgium when the first World War broke out in 1914. Their mother Grace took her daughters, three year old Thalia, two year old Marion and Kenyon who was just one month old and traveled from Ostend by steamer to Dover. After depositing the children at the home of her sister Helen in London, their mother traveled to Warsaw to join their father at the front. Their father, although wounded in the Meuse-Argonne offensive, survived the war and the family returned to the United States. Due to his military career, he was often absent from his children's lives while their mother was occupied with her life as a socialite, and seldom had time for her daughters.

The family had three homes: the Hotel Shelton in Manhattan, one in Washington and large mansion on Long Island, Bayport Wildholme which had belonged to Thalia's paternal grand-father. The property had in fact been left to Thalia's uncle John Ellis Roosevelt, but he allowed his brother's family to live there.

Thalia was first taught by private tutors and then later educated at a convent school in Belgium. Then followed a succession of boarding schools, Hillside School in Norwalk, Connecticut and then the National Cathedral school in Washington. Thalia and her sister it was said were only allowed to come home during Christmas or summer break, so as not to interfere with her parents social life.

Despite the family's seeming affluence, after her father retired from the army, their financial situation was somewhat insecure as the inheritance from his father ran out and Granville was unable to hold down a steady job.

Thalia's mother gave bridge lessons to friends and acquaintances in exchange for money and their sizable living expenses were paid by checks sent to her by her step-mother.

== Marriage ==
In November 1927, at the age of sixteen she married the Navy lieutenant Thomas Hedges Massie (1905–1987) at the Washington National Cathedral. At the time of their marriage Massie had recently graduated from the United States Naval Academy.

Massie's first posting was at New London, Connecticut, but he would eventually be stationed at Pearl Harbor in 1930

== The cases ==
On September 12, 1931, Thalia Massie was found by a passing driver, Eustace Bellinger, wandering along Ala Moana Road in Honolulu at about 1 am on a Sunday morning. She had been beaten and had suffered a broken jaw after being abducted while leaving a U.S. Navy party at the nearby Ala Wai Inn. When questioned by Bellinger and his passenger George Clark Jr., she stated that a group of 5 or 6 Hawaiian boys had assaulted her. Later at the hospital she claimed to police that she had been raped as well as assaulted.

Subsequently, five young men, Horace Ida, Henry Chang, Joseph Kahahawai, Benny Ahakuelo, and David Takai, two of Hawaiian ancestry, two of Japanese ancestry, and one of half Chinese/Hawaiian ancestry, who were initially arrested for assaulting a Hawaiian woman, Agnes Peeples, earlier that same night were later also charged with the rape of Massie. Joseph Kahahawai, a boxer, admitted to the earlier assault on Peeples, whom he had slugged and knocked over during a road rage incident at King and Liliha Streets, but all defendants denied having been involved in the assault on Massie. The men were represented by two of the foremost criminal lawyers in the islands, William Heen and William B. Pittman, and the mixed-race jury deadlocked along racial lines. The five defendants were released on bail to await retrial at a later date.

Thalia's mother, Grace Fortescue, was deeply disturbed by the release of the defendants and many U.S. Navy personnel at Pearl Harbor were outraged. A short time later, Joseph Kahahawai was abducted when leaving the courthouse after a probation hearing and was found, shot dead, in the back seat of Grace Fortescue's car. Defended by attorney Clarence Darrow of Scopes Monkey Trial fame, Fortescue, Thalia's husband Thomas Massie, and two Navy sailors were eventually tried and convicted of manslaughter in the death of Kahahawai. Originally sentenced to 10 years, their sentence was commuted to one hour in the executive chambers of Governor Lawrence Judd of the Territory of Hawaii.

== Late life and death ==
Thomas and Thalia Massie divorced on February 23, 1934, in Reno, Nevada.

In 1953, at the age of 42, she married 21-year-old Robert Thomlinson Uptigrove. They divorced in 1955.

She died of an overdose of barbiturate pills in Palm Beach, Florida, on July 3, 1963.

== Family tree ==
Hubbard-Fortescue family tree

David Charles Bell (1817–1902)	Gardiner Greene Hubbard (1822–1897)	Gertrude McCurdy (1827–1909)	Alexander Melville Bell (1819–1905)	Cornelius Roosevelt (1794–1871)	Margaret Barnhill (1799–1861)
Charles Bell (1858–1929)	Roberta Hubbard (1859–1885)	Mabel Hubbard (1857–1923)	A. G. Bell (1847–1922)	Robert Roosevelt (1829–1906)	Theodore Roosevelt, Sr. (1831–1878)
Grace Hubbard Fortescue (1883–1979)	"Rolly" Fortescue (1875–1952)	Theodore Roosevelt; U.S. President (1858–1919)
Thomas H. Massie (1905–1987)	Thalia Massie (1911–1963)	Julian Louis Reynolds (1910–1983)	Helene Whitney (1914–1990)

== See also ==
- Massie Trial
