= Mabel Gardiner Hubbard =

American businesswoman (1857–1923)

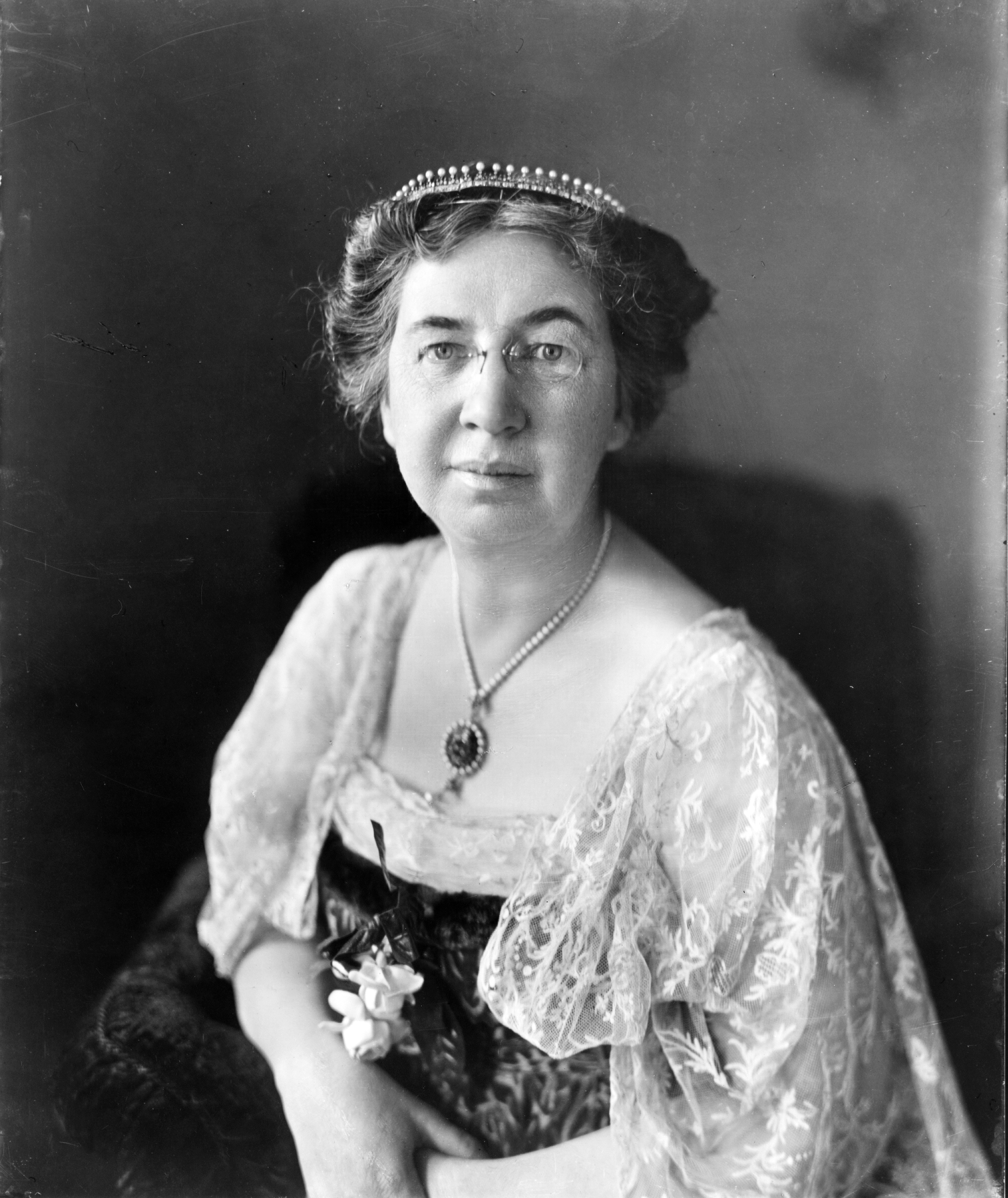
- Hubbard c. 1917
- Born: Mabel Gardiner Hubbard; November 25, 1857; Cambridge, Massachusetts, U.S.
- Died: January 3, 1923 (aged 65); Chevy Chase, Maryland, U.S.
- Resting place: Beinn Bhreagh, Nova Scotia, Canada
- Occupation: Businesswoman
- Spouse: Alexander Graham Bell (m. 1877; died 1922)
- Children: Elsie; Marian; Edward; Robert
- Father: Gardiner Greene Hubbard

Mabel Gardiner Hubbard Bell (November 25, 1857 – January 3, 1923) was an American businesswoman, and the daughter of Boston lawyer Gardiner Green Hubbard. She was the wife of Alexander Graham Bell, inventor of the first practical telephone.

From the time of Mabel's courtship with Graham Bell in 1873, until his death in 1922, Mabel became and remained the most significant influence in his life. Folklore held that Bell undertook telecommunication experiments in an attempt to restore her hearing which had been destroyed by disease close to her fifth birthday, leaving her completely deaf for the remainder of her life. (Note: Eber claimed that Mabel developed scarlet fever in New York "...shortly before her fifth birthday...", however Toward provided a detailed chronology of the event claiming "...shortly after their arrival in New York [in January 1863]....", when Mabel would have been at least five years and five weeks of age. Mabel's exact age when she became deaf would later play a part in the debate on the effectiveness of manual versus oral education for deaf children, as children who are older at the onset of deafness retain greater vocalization skills and are thus more successful in oral education programs. Some of the debate centred on whether Mabel had to relearn oral speech from scratch, or whether she never lost it.)

== Biography ==
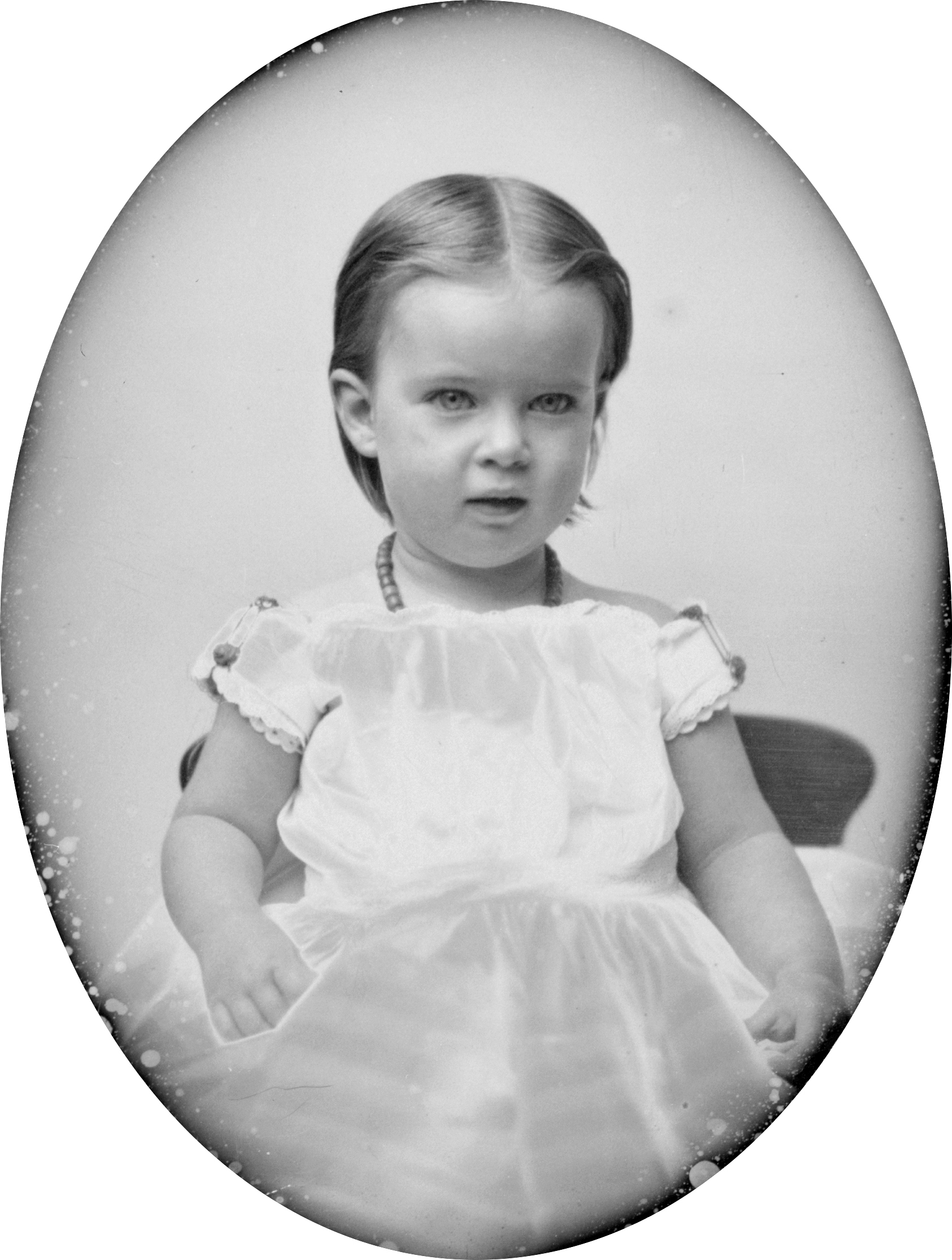
Mabel Hubbard Gardiner Bell as a girl, ca. 1860

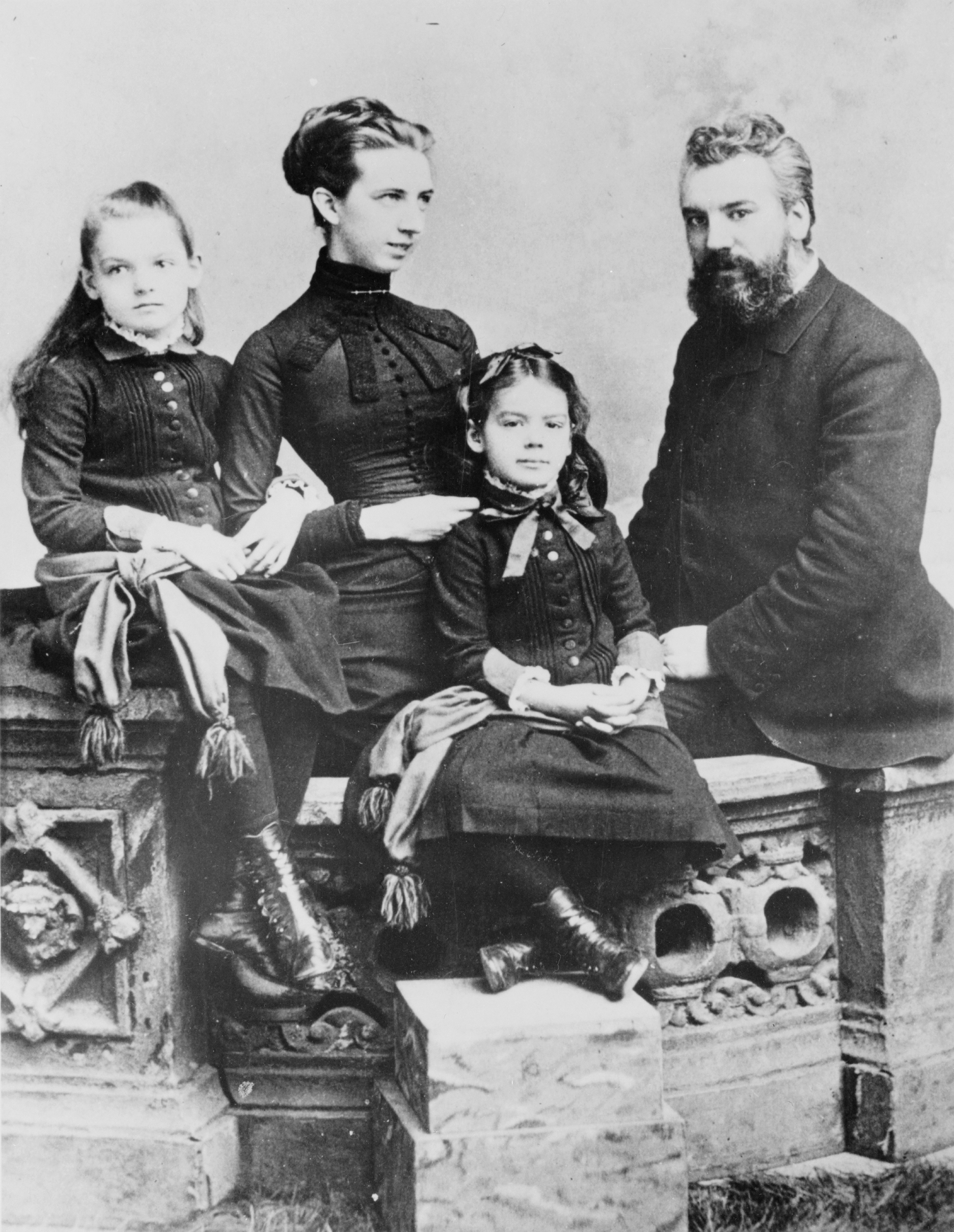
Mabel Gardiner Hubbard with her husband Alexander Graham Bell and their daughters Elsie (left) and Marian (1885)

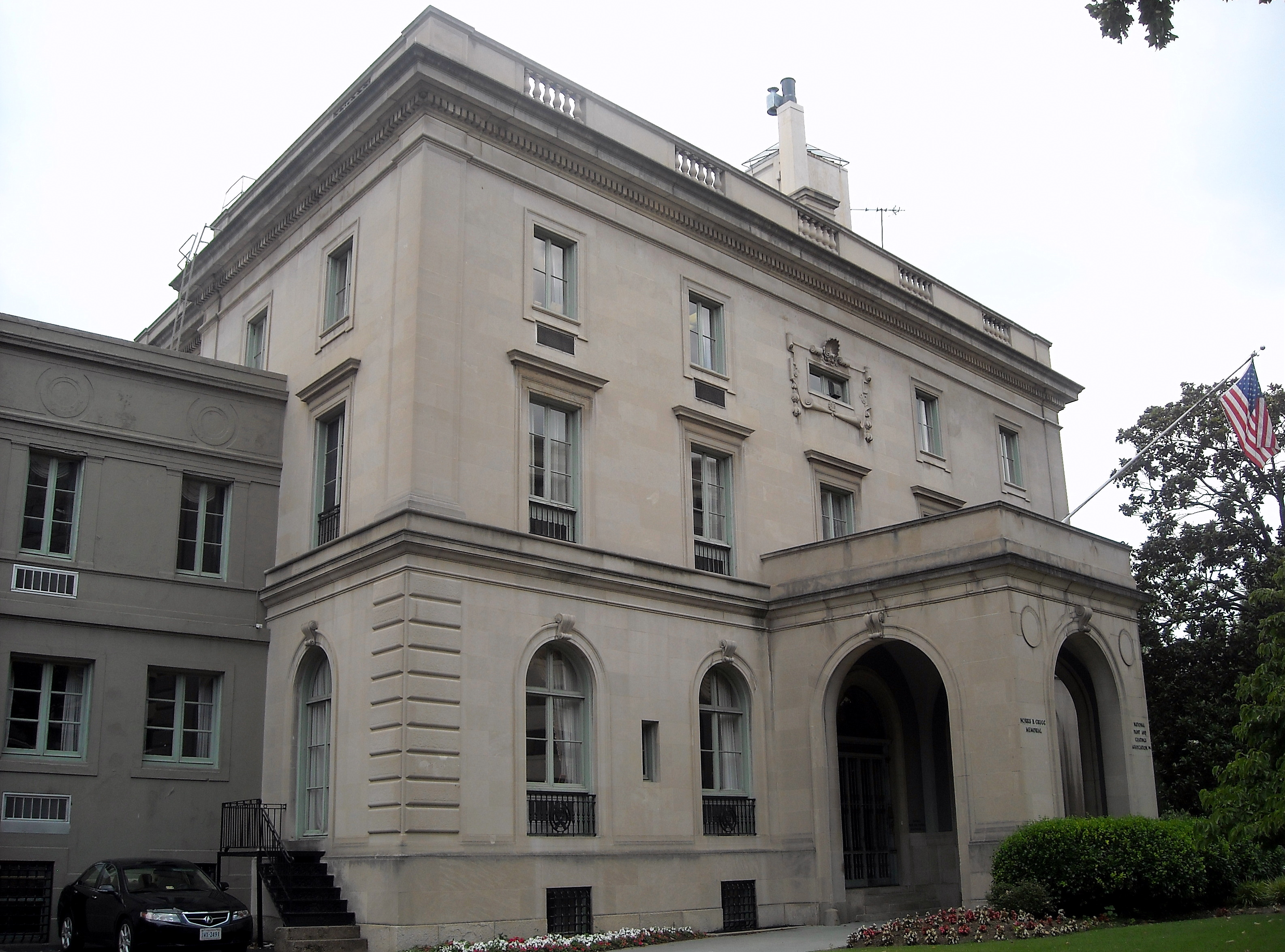
The Brodhead-Bell-Morton Mansion, the Bells' home from 1882–1889, in Washington, D.C., as it appeared in 2008

Mabel Gardiner Hubbard was born on November 25, 1857, in Cambridge, Massachusetts, United States, to Gardiner Greene Hubbard and Gertrude Mercer McCurdy. (Note: Her New York Times obituary lists her birth as November 25, 1859. Robert Bruce's and Charlotte Gray's biographies both give Mabel's birth year as 1857.) She had a near-fatal bout of scarlet fever close to her fifth birthday in 1862 while visiting her maternal grandparents in New York City, and was thereafter left permanently and completely deaf. The disease destroyed her inner ear's vestibular sensors, leaving her with a greatly impaired sense of balance, to the extent that it was very difficult for her to walk at night in the dark.

Mabel was the inspiration for her father's involvement in the founding of the first oral school for the deaf in the United States, the Clarke School for the Deaf. Having been educated in both the United States and in Europe, she learned to both talk and lip-read with great skill in multiple languages. She was also, due in great part to her parents' efforts, one of the first deaf children in the nation to be taught to both lip-read and speak, which allowed her to integrate herself easily and almost completely within the hearing world, an event virtually unknown to those in the deaf community of that era.

In support of her parents' efforts to increase funding for deaf education, Mabel testified before a congressional hearing at a young age. Her avoidance of the deaf community until her middle age when her parents died and left her to assume their roles as benefactor to the societies for the deaf, would later lead to criticisms that she was embarrassed by her impairment.

Described as "strong and self-assured", Hubbard became one of Bell's pupils at his new school for the deaf, and later evolved into his confidant. They married on July 11, 1877, in the Cambridge home of her parents, when she was 19, more than 10 years Bell's junior. Together they had four children, including two daughters: Elsie May Bell (1878–1964) who married Gilbert Hovey Grosvenor of National Geographic fame, and Marian Hubbard Bell (1880–1962), who was referred to as "Daisy", and who was nearly named Photophone by Bell after her birth.

Hubbard also bore two sons, Edward (1881) and Robert (1883), both of whom died shortly after birth leaving their parents bereft. From 1877, she and "Alec", as she preferred to call Bell, lived in Washington, D.C. at their home, the Brodhead-Bell Mansion, which they occupied for several years, and from 1888 onwards residing increasingly at their Beinn Bhreagh (Gaelic for "beautiful mountain") estate, in Cape Breton, Nova Scotia, Canada.

After her husband, Bell's death on August 2, 1922, Hubbard slowly lost her sight and grew increasingly consigned to the care of her daughters, withdrawing into a world of silent darkness. She died of pancreatic cancer at the home of her daughter Marian, in Chevy Chase, Maryland, five months later, on January 3, 1923, both of whom are buried near their home on "The Point" at their estate of Beinn Bhreagh, originally their summer residence. Her ashes were interred with Alexander's grave exactly one year, to the hour, after his burial. Today, they rest together near the top of their "beautiful mountain" of their estate overlooking Bras d'Or Lake, under a simple boulder of granite.

== 1876 Centennial Exposition ==
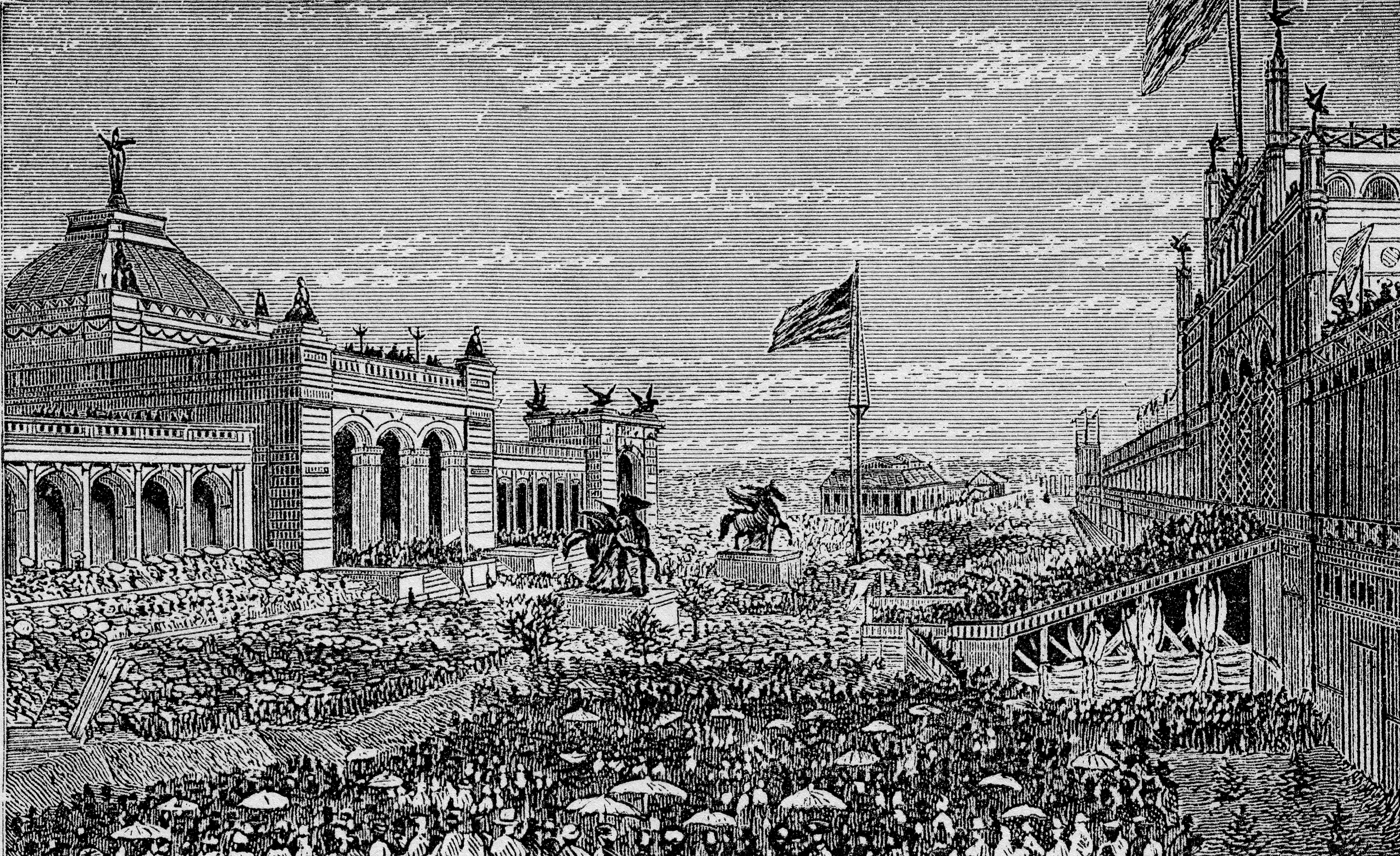
The Centennial Exhibition in Philadelphia, 1876, propelled the Bells to international fame.

Hubbard was the indirect source of her husband's early commercial success after his creation of the telephone. The U.S. Centennial Exposition in Philadelphia in 1876 made Bell's newly invented telephone a featured headline worldwide. Judges Emperor Dom Pedro II of the Empire of Brazil and the eminent British physicist William Thomson (Lord Kelvin) recommended his device to the Committee of Electrical Awards, which voted Bell the Gold Medal for Electrical Equipment. Bell also won a second Gold Medal for Visible Speech, for his additional display at the exposition, helping to propel him to international fame. Bell, who was then a full-time teacher, had not even planned on exhibiting at the fair due to his heavy teaching schedule and preparation for his students' examinations. He went there only at the stern insistence of his fiancée and future wife.

Hubbard understood Bell's reluctance to go to the exhibition and display his works. She secretly bought his train ticket to Philadelphia, packed his bag, and then took the unknowing Bell to Boston's train station where she told her shocked fiancé that he was going on a trip. When Bell started to argue, Hubbard turned her sight away from him, thus becoming literally deaf to his protests.

== Stock ownership in the Bell Telephone Company ==
The Bell Telephone Company was organized on July 9, 1877, by Hubbard's father Gardiner Greene Hubbard who owned 1,387 of the 5,000 issued shares and had the title of "trustee". Hubbard's husband Alexander Bell owned 1,497 shares. Bell immediately transferred all but 10 of his shares as a wedding gift to his new bride. A short time later, just prior to leaving for an extended honeymoon of Europe, Hubbard signed a power of attorney giving control of her shares to her father. This made Gardiner Hubbard the de facto president and chairman of the Bell Telephone Company, which later evolved into American Telephone & Telegraph, (aka AT&T) at times the world's largest telephone company.

== Support to aeronautical research ==
Hubbard was highly intelligent but usually preferred to remain in the background while Bell conducted scientific discussions and meetings among his peers—for many decades he held regular Wednesday evening intellectual salons in their home parlour, dutifully documented in the multiple volumes of his "homenotes". However, Hubbard strongly believed that a heavier-than-air vehicle could be designed to fly, and she provided the inspiration and financing of about $20,000CAD to that end, a significant amount in 1907 (approximately $450,000 in 2008 dollars).

At that time Hubbard sold some of her real estate and gave that amount of money to her husband and four others to establish the Aerial Experimental Association (AEA), for the purpose of constructing "a practical flying aerodrome", Canada's first heavier-than-air vehicle, the Silver Dart. Based on their scientific experiments, the aircraft they designed and built incorporated several technical innovations not previously invented for flight, including lateral control by means of ailerons. Partly because of her founding of the AEA, but also for founding social and educational institutions, she was named a National Historic Person in 2018.

== In popular culture ==
Catherine Joell MacKinnon portrays Hubbard in episode 3 of season 11 "8 Footsteps" (October 9, 2017) of the Canadian television period detective series Murdoch Mysteries.

== Family tree ==
Hubbard-Fortescue family tree

David Charles Bell (1817–1902)	Gardiner Greene Hubbard (1822–1897)	Gertrude McCurdy (1827–1909)	Alexander Melville Bell (1819–1905)	Cornelius Roosevelt (1794–1871)	Margaret Barnhill (1799–1861)
Charles Bell (1858–1929)	Roberta Hubbard (1859–1885)	Mabel Hubbard (1857–1923)	A. G. Bell (1847–1922)	Robert Roosevelt (1829–1906)	Theodore Roosevelt, Sr. (1831–1878)
Grace Hubbard Fortescue (1883–1979)	"Rolly" Fortescue (1875–1952)	Theodore Roosevelt; U.S. President (1858–1919)
Thomas H. Massie (1905–1987)	Thalia Massie (1911–1963)	Julian Louis Reynolds (1910–1983)	Helene Whitney (1914–1990)
