= Granville Roland Fortescue =

American soldier and journalist (1875–1952)

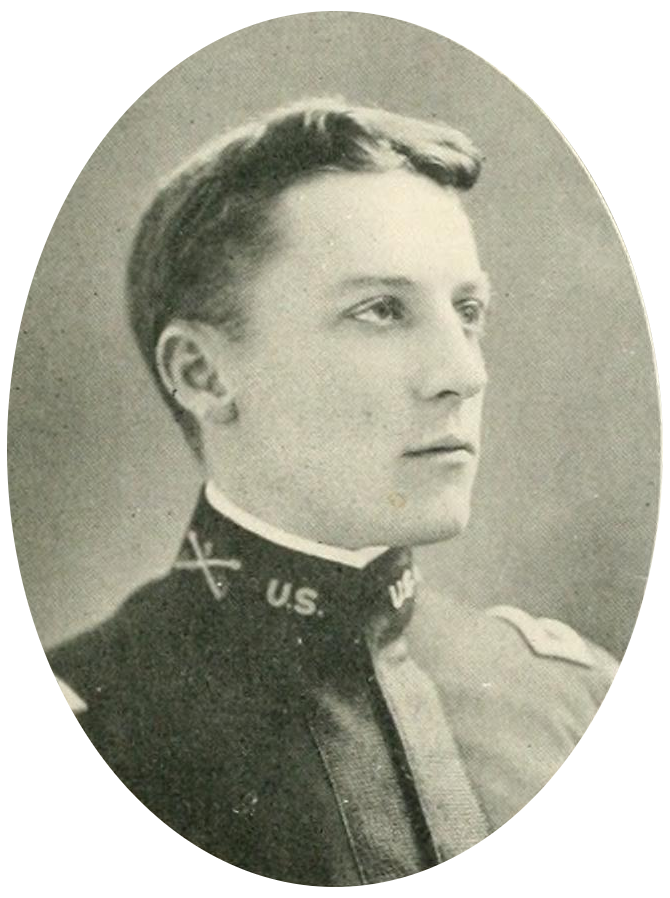
- G. Roland Fortescue
- Born: October 12, 1875; New York City, US
- Died: April 21, 1952 (aged 76)
- Burial place: Arlington National Cemetery
- Relatives: Robert Roosevelt (father); Grace Hubbard Fortescue (wife); Thalia Massie (daughter); Helene Reynolds (daughter); Theodore Roosevelt (first cousin)
- Military career
- Allegiance: United States of America
- Branch: United States Army
- Service years: 1898–1906; 1917–1928
- Rank: Major
- Nickname: "Rollie"
- Unit: 1st United States Volunteer Cavalry
- Conflicts: Spanish–American War: San Juan Hill; Philippine–American War; Russo-Japanese War (military attaché); World War I Rif War {Correspondent
- Awards: Distinguished Service Cross; Purple Heart; Order of the Rising Sun (Japan)
- Other work: author, journalist

Granville Roland Fortescue (October 12, 1875 – April 21, 1952) was an American soldier, a Rough Rider serving with his cousin, Colonel Theodore Roosevelt in Cuba, a presidential aide in the first Roosevelt administration and later, a journalist and war correspondent for the London Standard during the Rif War in 1920 Spanish Morocco. He wrote for the London Daily Telegraph during World War I and during the Spanish Civil War.

== Early life and education ==
Fortescue was the son of U.S. Congressman Robert Roosevelt (1829–1906), and Marion Theresa "Minnie" O'Shea Fortescue, his mistress. At the time of his birth, his father was still married to his first wife, Elizabeth Ellis. After Ellis' death, Robert married Minnie. His father then adopted the three children that he had conceived with Minnie before their marriage, Granville, Kenyon, and Maud, and they were known as his stepchildren, although they were his biological children. At the time of their birth, their father had been listed as "Robert Francis Fortescue," and all maintained the Fortescue name throughout their lives, even though they were born to Robert Roosevelt.

His father, Robert Roosevelt, was the brother of Theodore Roosevelt, Sr., the uncle of President Theodore Roosevelt and the great-uncle of Eleanor Roosevelt.

Fortescue's undergraduate education began at Yale College; then he transferred to the University of Pennsylvania. His college years were cut short when he volunteered in 1898 for the 1st United States Volunteer Cavalry. He completed his education when he graduated from the Army Staff College in 1904.

== Career ==
Fortescue was a Rough Rider wounded at San Juan Hill in Cuba and serving in the Philippines during the Spanish–American War.

Fortescue was posted as a U.S. military attaché in Japan during the Russo-Japanese War. Along with other Western military attachés, he had two complementary missions—to assist the Japanese and to observe the Japanese forces in the field during the Russo-Japanese War. Service as an artillery officer during World War I was the capstone of Fortescue's military career.

=== Military honors ===
- Purple Heart, wounded in foot at San Juan Hill, Cuba, July 1898; wounded at Montfaucon d'Argonne in the Meuse-Argonne Offensive, September 1918.
- Distinguished Service Cross.
- World War I Victory Medal
- Spanish Campaign Medal
- Philippine Insurrection War Medal
- Order of the Rising Sun, Japan.
- Russo-Japanese War Medal, Japan.

== Personal life ==
In 1910, Captain "Rolly" Fortescue married Grace Hubbard Fortescue (née Grace Hubbard Bell) (1883–1979), a niece of the inventor Alexander Graham Bell and an heir to the Bell Telephone Company fortune. The wedding party included Captain Archibald Butt, who served with the groom in the White House as a Presidential aide. The couple had three daughters:

- Thalia Fortescue (1911–1963), who married Thomas Hedges Massie (1905–1987), a Navy lieutenant.
- Kenyon Fortescue (1914–1990), an actress whose stage-name was Helene Whitney; she married J. Louis Reynolds in 1936.
- Marion Fortescue, who married Daulton Gillespie Viskniskki in 1934

The couple's eldest daughter, Thalia Massie, was allegedly raped in 1932, and this embroiled her mother, Grace Fortescue, in a case of murder. The trial for murder, conducted in Hawaii in 1932, came to be known as the "Massie Affair". Afterwards, Grace returned to a quiet life with her husband as they moved seasonally between family homes on Long Island and in Palm Beach.

Fortescue died on April 21, 1952, and was laid to rest in Arlington National Cemetery, the only Roosevelt to be buried there.

=== Family tree ===
Hubbard-Fortescue family tree

David Charles Bell (1817–1902)	Gardiner Greene Hubbard (1822–1897)	Gertrude McCurdy (1827–1909)	Alexander Melville Bell (1819–1905)	Cornelius Roosevelt (1794–1871)	Margaret Barnhill (1799–1861)
Charles Bell (1858–1929)	Roberta Hubbard (1859–1885)	Mabel Hubbard (1857–1923)	A. G. Bell (1847–1922)	Robert Roosevelt (1829–1906)	Theodore Roosevelt, Sr. (1831–1878)
Grace Hubbard Fortescue (1883–1979)	"Rolly" Fortescue (1875–1952)	Theodore Roosevelt; U.S. President (1858–1919)
Thomas H. Massie (1905–1987)	Thalia Massie (1911–1963)	Julian Louis Reynolds (1910–1983)	Helene Whitney (1914–1990)

== Published works ==
His journalism experience led to further writing:

- 1914 – At the Front with Three Allies: My Adventures in the Great War. London: A. Melrose, Ltd.
- 1915 – Russia, the Balkans and the Dardanelles. London: A. Melrose, Ltd. OCLC: 1562062
- 1915 – What of the Dardanelles? An Analysis. London: Hodder and Stoughton. OCLC: 2736904
- 1916 – Fore-armed: How to Build a Citizen Army. Philadelphia: John C. Winston Co. OCLC: 406647
- 1917 – France Bears the Burden. New York: Macmillan. OCLC: 1183757
- 1937 – Front Line and Deadline: The Experiences of a War Correspondent. New York: G. P. Putnam's Sons. OCLC: 987696

== See also ==
- Military attachés and observers in the Russo-Japanese War
