= Helene Whitney =

American actress (1914–1990)

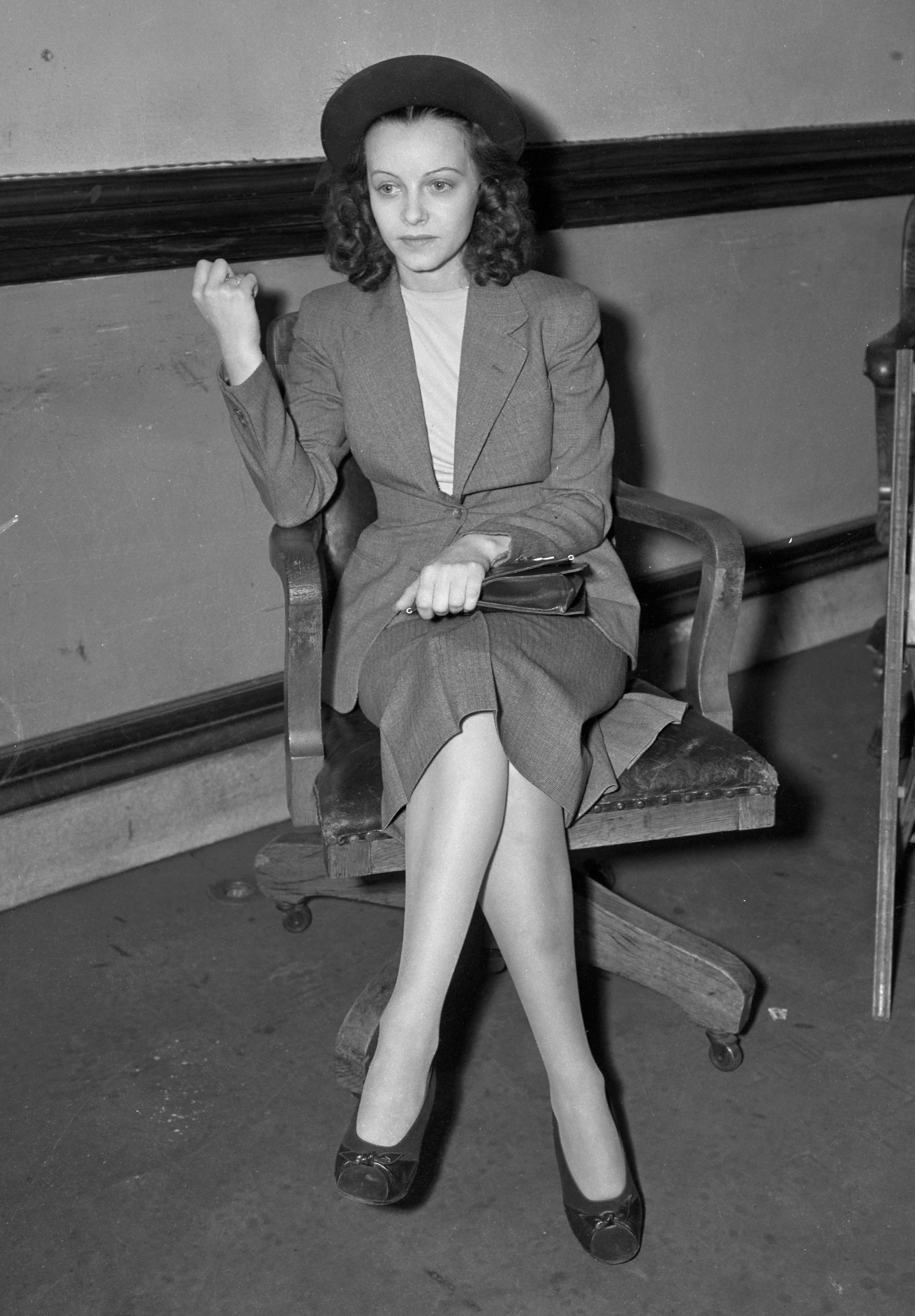
- Whitney (as Fortescue Reynolds) in Los Angeles, 1930s
- Born: Kenyon Fortescue; July 4, 1914; Brussels, Belgium
- Died: March 28, 1990 (aged 75); Atlantis, Florida, U.S.
- Other names: Helen Fortescue; Joyce Gardner; Helene Reynolds
- Years active: 1939–1948
- Spouse: J. Louis Reynolds (1936–1939; divorced)
- Parent(s): Granville Roland Fortescue; Grace Fortescue

Helene Whitney (born Kenyon Fortescue, July 4, 1914 – March 28, 1990) was an American actress who appeared in films in the late 1930s and 1940s. She was known as Helene Reynolds after her marriage.

== Biography ==
Whitney was born Kenyon Fortescue in 1914, but was known as Helene. Through her mother, Grace Fortescue, she was a grandniece (and cousin twice removed) of Alexander Graham Bell, who invented the telephone. Through her father Granville Roland Fortescue, she was a first cousin once removed of US President Theodore Roosevelt.

Whitney grew up in Washington D.C. where she attended the National Cathedral School for Girls. She married Julian Louis Reynolds, son of Richard S. Reynolds, Sr. and heir to the Reynolds aluminum and tobacco fortunes, on July 15, 1936, in Washington, becoming Helene Fortescue Reynolds. After three years of marriage, they divorced in May 1939.

Whitney later became an actress, using the stage names of Joyce Gardner, Helene Whitney and Helene Reynolds, appeared in films in the late 1930s and 1940s and later in stage productions. After her acting career ended, she became a Manhattan art gallery proprietor and artist in the 1960s. She died of pneumonia at the John F. Kennedy Medical Center in Atlantis, Florida aged 75 on March 28, 1990.

== Filmography ==
As Helene Whitney/Helen Whitney

Year	Title	Role	
1939	The Hunchback of Notre Dame	Fleur de Lys	NYT (subscription required)
1940	The Saint's Double Trouble	Anne Bitts	IMDb
1940	Millionaire Playboy aka Glamour Boy (UK)	uncredited	IMDb
1940	The Philadelphia Story	Main Line Society Woman	IMDb
1941	City of Missing Girls	Katherine Crawford	IMDb

As Helene Reynolds

Year	Title	Role	
1941	Confirm or Deny	Dorothy	IMDb
1941	Blue, White and Perfect	Helen Shaw	NYT
1942	Girl Trouble	Helen Martin	IMDb
1942	Roxie Hart	Velma Wall	IMDb
1942	Tales of Manhattan	Actress	IMDb
1942	Moontide	Woman in boat	IMDb
1942	The Man Who Wouldn't Die	Anna Wolff	NYT
1943	Dixie Dugan	Jean Patterson	IMDb
1943	Heaven Can Wait	Peggy Nash	IMdb
1943	Wintertime	Marian Daly (uncredited)	NYT (subscription required)
1943	The Meanest Man in the World	Wife (Park Ave. Neighbor)	IMDb
1944	Bermuda Mystery	Angela	IMDb

== Television ==
As Helene Reynolds

Year	Title	Role	
1945	The Front Page	Mollie Malloy	IMDb
1948	Mirage in Manhattan (Chevrolet Tele-Theatre)		IMDb

== Stage ==
- Oh, Captain! (February 4, 1958 – July 19, 1958)
- Happy Hunting (December 6, 1956 – November 30, 1957)
- Call Me Madam (October 12, 1950 – May 3, 1952)
- Miss Liberty (July 15, 1949 – April 8, 1950)
- High Button Shoes (October 9, 1947 – July 2, 1949)
- Yours Is My Heart (September 5, 1946 – October 5, 1946)

== Family tree ==
Hubbard-Fortescue family tree

David Charles Bell (1817–1902)	Gardiner Greene Hubbard (1822–1897)	Gertrude McCurdy (1827–1909)	Alexander Melville Bell (1819–1905)	Cornelius Roosevelt (1794–1871)	Margaret Barnhill (1799–1861)
Charles Bell (1858–1929)	Roberta Hubbard (1859–1885)	Mabel Hubbard (1857–1923)	A. G. Bell (1847–1922)	Robert Roosevelt (1829–1906)	Theodore Roosevelt, Sr. (1831–1878)
Grace Hubbard Fortescue (1883–1979)	"Rolly" Fortescue (1875–1952)	Theodore Roosevelt; U.S. President (1858–1919)
Thomas H. Massie (1905–1987)	Thalia Massie (1911–1963)	Julian Louis Reynolds (1910–1983)	Helene Whitney (1914–1990)
