= Massie Trial =

1932 murder trial in Hawaii

The Massie Trial, for what was known as the Massie Affair, was a 1932 criminal trial that took place in Honolulu, Hawaii Territory. The affair started with a trial of five men on the charge of rape of a U.S. Navy wife, Thalia Massie. The trial ended in mistrial due to a hung jury, and they were never re-tried. One of the five, well-known Hawaiian prizefighter Joseph Kahahawai, was murdered, and Thalia's mother, Grace Fortescue; her husband, Thomas Massie; and two others were found with the body and charged for the crime. The murder trial of Fortescue, Massie and the others resulted in conviction, but their sentences were commuted to just one hour in the governor's office. The trials evoked widespread interest and also social tensions in Hawaii that authorities feared would incite a riot.

== Background ==
=== Massie family ===
Grace Hubbard Fortescue, née Grace Hubbard Bell, was the granddaughter of Gardiner Greene Hubbard, the first president of the National Geographic Society. Her father, Charles James Bell, was first cousin of inventor Alexander Graham Bell. Her marriage to Major Roland Granville "Rolly" Fortescue, an out-of-wedlock son of Robert Barnwell Roosevelt, did not leave her as financially successful as she would have wished, but she nevertheless kept up appearances and raised her daughter, Thalia, with an American upper class lifestyle.

Thalia Fortescue married Lieutenant Thomas Massie, a rising United States Navy officer. In 1930, Massie arrived at Pearl Harbor, where Thalia considered herself "above" the rest of the officers' wives and soon became an outcast. The marriage, apparently not terribly successful to start with, degenerated into heavy drinking and public fights. Thalia had a second miscarriage shortly prior to the incident, and was "on probation" with her husband, who wrote an informal set of conditions under which he would continue the marriage.

=== Honolulu Police ===
In 1931, the Honolulu police force was bitterly split between two factions: the McIntosh faction, led by Captain Nelson McIntosh, which consisted mostly of white officers; and the Hao faction, led by Deputy Sheriff David Hao, which consisted mostly of police officers of Hawaiian heritage. Both factions had political backing – McIntosh was the choice of Hawaii's business elite, while Hao had the backing of still politically powerful Hawaiian royalty. McIntosh was regarded as a racist by indigenous Hawaiians, while Hao's faction was considered corrupt by McIntosh's faction. Patrick K. Gleason, the sheriff of Honolulu, tried to keep peace within his department as he needed the votes of both factions to win re-election.

Things got particularly heated in August 1931, when Hao was forced into retirement. While the retirement itself was not finalized, McIntosh temporarily took over his position, with all of the detectives formally reporting to him. However, as McIntosh was hostile to detectives from Hao's faction, Sheriff Gleason would give some of them direct assignments, thus retaining the parallel command structure.

=== The accused ===
Two of the accused – Joseph Kahahawai and Ben Ahakuelo – were well known local sportsmen. Kahahawai was a boxer, and Ahakuelo both participated in boxing and played in semi-professional football leagues.

== Events of September 12–13, 1931 ==
On the evening of Saturday, September 12, 1931, the Massies, the Browns, and the Bransons – all Navy couples – attended a Navy event at the Ala Wai Inn, a Waikiki nightclub. At about 11:30 p.m., Thalia had an argument with a Lieutenant Stogsdal, which ended with her slapping an officer and then storming out. Thomas, not having witnessed the event, assumed she was tired and had gone home, and stayed at the nightclub. Meanwhile, at some time between 11:30 and 12:00, Thalia left the Ala Wai Inn. She claimed to have walked towards Waikiki Park – a dance hall a few hundred meters from the nightclub, which had a dance that night as well. The dance was normally scheduled to end at 11:45, but ended closer to 11:55 that night.

At some time between 12:20 and 12:45 Sunday morning, Thalia was picked up by a car driving along Ala Moana Road, then a relatively isolated road that connected Waikiki to Honolulu which was often used as a lover's lane by locals. The car was occupied by the Berringer and Clark families, who were the first to definitely recognize Thalia after she left Ala Wai Inn. According to their testimony, Thalia claimed that she was assaulted and robbed (but not raped) by several Hawaiian men. She declined police intervention and asked to be taken home; she got there at about 1 a.m. However, the driver made several mistakes while driving there, so it was not the shortest route. As Thomas was still not home and she did not have keys, Thalia had to break through the back door to get inside.

The last dance at Ala Wai Inn was supposed to stop at midnight; however, the patrons did not let the orchestra stop until 1 a.m. At that time, Thomas tried to look for his wife once more, but gave up and went for an after-party at Rigby's home, where the Navy officers were supposed to meet after the evening. He was accompanied by Lieutenant Branson, whose wife left with their car. However, there was no party at Rigby's, so Branson fell asleep there, and Thomas went for some late snacks. Thomas tried to call his wife to make sure she had arrived safely—after several calls she finally answered. She told Thomas to come home immediately, as something terrible had happened to her. Thomas took the car and left, leaving the sleeping Branson behind.

As Thomas arrived home, Thalia told him about the assault. Over her objections, Thomas immediately phoned the police, who arrived to take her statement. Initially she could not provide any details at all, stating that it was too dark to identify any of the men or to see any details of the car they emerged from. However, Thalia changed her story several hours later, not only describing the assailants as "locals", but giving police a license plate number.

Within hours the police arrested a Japanese American man named Horace Ida. Ida was not entirely surprised at first, as only a few hours earlier he had been involved in a near collision while driving his sister's car with several friends, including Kahahawai and Ahakuelo. Although there was no damage, an argument broke out with the couple driving the other car, which culminated in Kahahawai slugging the woman. Upon his arrival at the police station, the altercation were not brought up – instead he found to his dismay that he was being charged with rape.

== Territory of Hawaii v. Ben Ahakuelo et al. ==
At first glance, the story seemed to be credible. Thalia's license plate was off by only one digit (or letter) and her description of the men, Ida and his friends, was fairly accurate. However, it later became known that the police taking Thalia's statement had in fact "told her" both pieces of information, apparently after hearing the name and description from the initial complaint filed by the woman driver. Attorney Charles Riccio, a legal advisor with the Colorado State Patrol, offers the following account of the incident involving Horace Ida:

Horace Ida, a young Japanese man, had borrowed his sister's two-year-old car and had attended a luau accompanied by his pals Joe Kahahawai, Benny Ahakuelo, David Takai and Henry Chang. At about 12:30 a.m., Horace suggested they call it a night. He and his friends piled into the car and left the luau.

As the car passed through an intersection in downtown Honolulu, Horace barely missed colliding with an automobile coming from the opposite direction. There was no contact between the two cars, but both drivers stopped and everyone piled out to argue the fine points of Hawaiian motor vehicle law.

The occupants of the other car were a Mr. and Mrs. Peeples. Mrs. Peeples was voicing her opinion of Horace Ida's driving skills when Big Joe Kahahawai (all six feet and more of him) hauled off and punched her in the face. Mrs. Peeples was equal to the challenge. She gave as good as she got. She clenched her fist, wound up, and to Big Joe's surprise, slugged him in the mouth! The incident was about to become a donnybrook. However, cooler heads prevailed, and the Peeples drove off to the police station to report the incident.

At the station, the Peeples gave Horace Ida's license plate as 58-895, and the police put out an all points bulletin for the car and its occupants. At about the same time, the police learned of the rape in Ala Moana Park, so it was only natural that they would assume that the occupants of the Ida car were more than likely the perpetrators of the assault on Thalia Massie.

Horace Ida and his friends were eventually located through the car's license plate and were brought before Thalia at the police station. She was unable to identify Horace Ida, who was wearing a brown leather jacket when she saw him. When asked the license number of the assailants' car, she did not remember it, but she later heard the plate number 58-895 being broadcast at the police station.

The next day, under further questioning, Thalia's story began to change. She now "remembered" that one of her assailants had been wearing a brown leather jacket and the license plate of the assailants' car was 58-805 (only one digit was different from the number of Horace Ida's plate). To the police, the case against Horace Ida and his friends began to look stronger. The five men insisted they were not part of any assault on a lone white woman walking through the darkness of John Ena Road. They explained their movements on the night at length. But the police were not persuaded. The five young men were indicted and charged with rape and assault.

Rear Admiral Yates Stirling Jr., Commandant of the US Navy's 14th Naval District (which included the Hawaiian islands), indicated that his first inclination was to lynch the accused assailants, but that they must give "the authorities a chance to carry out the law and not interfere."

As the case developed, cracks in Thalia's story immediately appeared. In order to have assaulted Thalia – an event so far unproven to have even occurred – it would have been extremely difficult to have then been involved in the near accident across town. The police themselves were split on the case; many of the detectives were locals who saw the case was a sham and, when they were denied access in the courtroom, started to talk directly to the press.

Riccio:

While the good citizens of Honolulu waited for the trial to begin, rumors began to develop and spread through the city. There were those who whispered that Thalia had not been raped at all. It was said that she was having an illicit relationship with one of the five beach boy suspects, and that she was on her way to a rendezvous with him when she found him in the company of four drunken friends.

It was also speculated that Thalia was having an affair with one of Tommie's shipmates. When Tommie came home after the party, so the gossip went, he found his wife and his friend in flagrante delicto and it was Tommie who beat up his wife and broke her jaw.

Grace Fortescue, enraged by the stories and what she saw as an attempt to sully the name of her daughter and the family, started a public campaign to attack the defendants. However, the case quickly fell apart in court. After a three-week trial and lengthy jury deliberation, the jurors declared themselves deadlocked and a mistrial was declared.

== Territory of Hawaii v. Grace Fortescue, et al. ==
Grace was not willing to wait for another trial. She first arranged for the kidnapping and vicious beating of Ida, then talked Thomas into kidnapping Kahahawai, the darkest skinned of the five defendants, with the help of two Navy enlisted men—Albert O. Jones and Edward J. Lord. Kahahawai underwent "interrogation", as Grace, Thomas, and the two Navy men attempted to beat a confession out of him—eventually, one of the four shot Kahahawai dead.

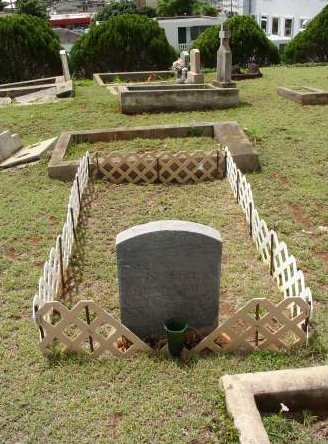
Grave of Joseph Kahahawai Jr., at Puea Cemetery in Kalihi, Honolulu

Debating what to do, the group eventually decided to dump Kahahawai's body off Koko Head, at the time a desolate area far away from urban Honolulu. Although he would eventually be found, it seemed to them unlikely that anyone would care. They wrapped Kahahawai in a sheet and put him in Fortescue's rented car, pulling down the shades to hide the interior. A police motorcyclist, alerted to the kidnapping, saw the blinds and considered it suspicious. He pulled them over, discovered Kahahawai's body and immediately arrested all four on suspicion of murder.

Clarence Darrow decided to take on the group's defense for the sum of $30,000. He was brought out of retirement by Eva Stotesbury, an old family friend and the wife of Edward T. Stotesbury.

Throughout the trial, Thalia presented herself as an innocent victim. The prosecutor, John Kelley, played on her feelings of superiority. She became enraged, ripped up a piece of evidence, and stormed from the stand. Although this would seem to be a prosecution victory, the courtroom erupted in supportive applause from the spectators.

The jury returned a verdict of manslaughter rather than murder. Racial tensions were so high that everyone had expected another hung jury. The mainland press exploded with even more stories and the situation in Hawaii grew more tense. Martial law was considered by Admiral Stirling if rioting were to begin, as he had considered imposing it from the start.

After a flurry of diplomatic maneuvering between Washington, D.C. and Honolulu, martial law was avoided. Instead, under pressure from the Navy, Territorial Governor Lawrence M. Judd commuted the 10-year sentences of the convicted killers to one hour, to be served in his office. Days later the entire group, including the Massies, the two other Navy men, Fortescue and Darrow, boarded a ship and left the island in turmoil. Thalia and Massie divorced in 1934; she committed suicide in 1963; he died in 1987. Grace Hubbard Fortescue died in 1979 and is buried at Arlington National Cemetery. Albert Jones died on September 23, 1966. Edward Lord died in 1967.

In 1966, while being interviewed by author Peter Van Slingerland, Albert O. Jones admitted that he was the one who shot Joseph Kahahawai.

== Pinkerton investigation of the "Ala Moana" case ==
Although the prosecution's lead witness, Thalia Massie, had left the Territory and could not be forced to return to testify, the four surviving Ala Moana defendants could not be exonerated or convicted. As Peter Van Slingland wrote, "Congress, the Navy, and mainland public opinion would not allow the charges to be dropped without good reason." Before the subsequent dismissal of the charges, Governor Judd hired Pinkerton detectives to further investigate and to review the evidence. The Pinkerton agency responded with a 279-page report, in which the introductory letter stated:

An analysis of the reports of our representatives, together, with the reports and statements of the Attorney General's office, the office of the Public Prosecutor, and the Police Department, also the testimony at the trial of the defendants, makes it impossible to escape the conviction that the kidnaping [sic] and assault was not caused by those accused, with the attendant circumstances alleged by Mrs. Massie.

== In popular culture ==
In February 1986, CBS-TV aired a four-hour miniseries produced by Lorimar Productions titled Blood & Orchids, written for television by Norman Katkov, who based his teleplay on his own novel of the same title. Though Katkov said that he based his novel on the Massie Affair, his novel and teleplay bear only a superficial resemblance to fact. Katkov changed all the names of the principal characters and added other characters for whom no historical warrant can be found (most notably, Police Captain Curtis Maddox, supposedly the one conscientious law-enforcement officer who ever investigated the affair). Katkov's story also departs significantly from actual events in many ways, such as making the murder of Kahahawai look like a crime of passion—and laying all the blame on Lieutenant Massie and not on Grace Fortescue.

Max Allan Collins' 1996 novel, Damned in Paradise, follows the facts of the case more closely than Katkov's book. An entry in his series about Depression-era private eye Nate Heller, Damned in Paradise casts Heller as the personal investigator for Darrow after the famed attorney is retained to represent Lt. Massie, Grace Fortescue, and the other defendants accused of Kahahawai's murder. Collins also includes fictionalized depictions of such historical figures as John Jardine, one of the actual Honolulu police detectives who investigated the case, and Chang Apana, the real-life inspiration for Charlie Chan, who was still an active-duty detective in HPD at the time of the Massie case (though there's no official record to suggest that Chang was actually one of the investigating officers). As is often the case in the Heller series, Collins provides an alternate solution as to who might have been responsible for Mrs. Massie's rape.

In his afterword to Damned in Paradise, Collins suggested that Robert Traver's 1958 novel, Anatomy of a Murder, was loosely inspired by the Massie case, involving, as it does, a military officer who murders the alleged rapist of his wife and the subsequent trial arising from that murder, with the setting changed from Honolulu to Michigan's Upper Peninsula, and the Naval officer changed to an Army officer. However, in 1952 Traver himself defended an Army officer accused of the murder of his wife's alleged attacker, and, despite the striking parallels to the Massie incident, it is more likely that this was the case from which Traver derived his plot.

The case was revisited in 2016 by Investigation Discovery's series A Crime to Remember (Season 4 Episode 4, "Paradise Lost").

The Offshore podcast in 2016, by Honolulu Civil Beat and PRX, covered the Massie Case in episode 4, "A Sinister Past."

In 2021, a short film based on the incident, Ala Moana Boys, received its premiere at the Hawaii International Film Festival. In 2022, it was broadcast as part of the PBS Short Film Festival.

== 2006 mock trial ==
During the American Bar Association convention at the Hawaii Convention Center in Honolulu, on August 3, 2006, then Lt. Gov. Duke Aiona served as the judge at the mock trial, using a copy of the Pinkerton National Detective Agency report compiled by the then Territorial Government and using 21st century forensic techniques, looked into the rape case once more. Lawyers attending the convention acted as the jury.

After testimony from two experts, and new arguments about the case, the lawyers voted with a unanimous "Not guilty" verdict for all defendants. Among other deciding factors was the defense's evidence that the five men accused of the rape had been involved in violence on the other side of Honolulu (the near collision with the Peeples's car) near the time of the alleged attack on Massie and would not have been able to reach Waikiki in time to have also raped Massie as she described.

In a coincidental historical twist, the Hawaii Convention Center—where the mock trial was held—sits on the former site of the Ala Wai Inn, where the case first started.

== See also ==
- White privilege
