= Bermuda Mystery =

1944 film by Benjamin Stoloff

- Theatrical release poster
- Directed by: Benjamin Stoloff
- Screenplay by: Scott Darling
- Story by: John Larkin
- Produced by: William Girard
- Starring: Preston Foster; Ann Rutherford; Charles Butterworth; Helene Reynolds; Jean Howard; Richard Lane
- Cinematography: Joseph LaShelle
- Edited by: Norman Colbert
- Music by: Arthur Lange
- Production company: 20th Century Fox
- Distributed by: 20th Century Fox
- Release date: May 1, 1944
- Running time: 65 minutes
- Country: United States
- Language: English

Bermuda Mystery is a 1944 American mystery film directed by Benjamin Stoloff and written by Scott Darling. The film stars Preston Foster, Ann Rutherford, Charles Butterworth, Helene Reynolds, Jean Howard and Richard Lane. The film was released on May 1, 1944, by 20th Century Fox.

== Cast ==
- Preston Foster as Steve Carramond
- Ann Rutherford as Constance Martin
- Charles Butterworth as Dr. Randolph Tilford
- Helene Reynolds as Angela
- Jean Howard as Mrs. Valerie Tilford
- Richard Lane as Detective Sergeant Donovan
- Roland Drew as John Best
- John Eldredge as Lyman Brooks
- Theodore von Eltz as Lee Cooper
- Pierre Watkin as Herbert Bond
- Jason Robards, Sr. as Mark Dunham
- Kane Richmond as Frank Martin
- Olin Howland as Gas Station Owner

== See also ==
- List of American films of 1944
