= Allotment Commission (United States Civil War) =

The Allotment Commission was a quasi-governmental agency of the federal government of the United States during the Civil War. It was established by an act of Congress on December 24, 1861, It was a voluntary program whereby 1/3 of a participating Union soldier's pay was sent home to family and friends. The purpose was to prevent wasteful spending among idle and bored soldiers in camp. Among the first commissioners was Theodore Roosevelt's father, Theodore Roosevelt, Sr. Among those lobbying for passage of the act was Robert Roosevelt, brother of the senior Theodore Roosevelt.
