= Grace Fortescue =

American socialite convicted of manslaughter (1883–1979)

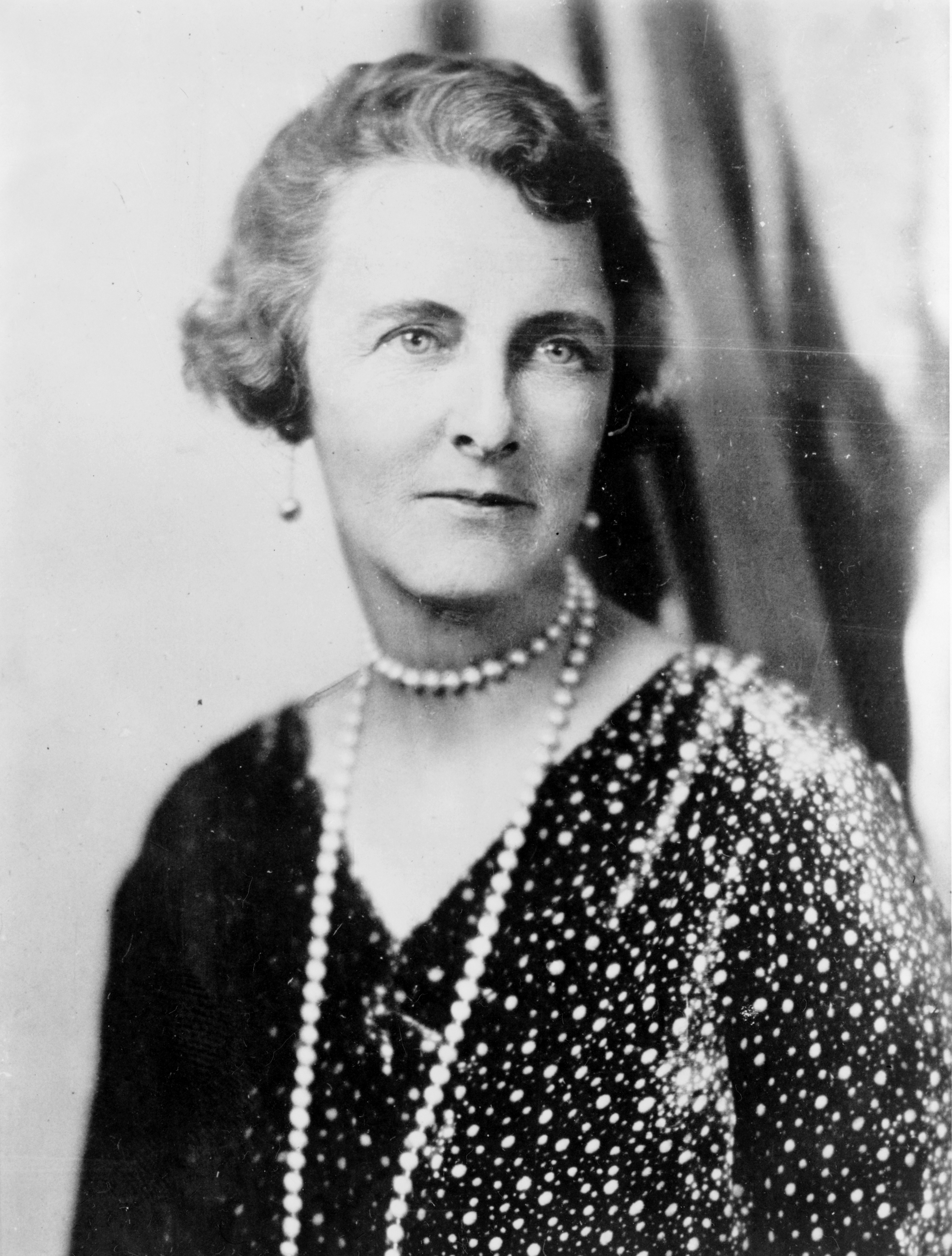
- 1932 portrait of Fortescue
- Born: Grace Hubbard Bell; November 3, 1883; Washington D.C., U.S.
- Died: June 24, 1979 (aged 95); Palm Beach, Florida, U.S.
- Spouse: Granville Roland Fortescue (m. 1910)
- Children: Thalia Fortescue Massie; Marion Fortescue Viskniskki; Helene Whitney
- Parent(s): Charles J. Bell; Roberta Wolcott Hubbard Bell
- Relatives: Gardiner Greene Hubbard (grandfather)

Grace Hubbard Fortescue, (née Bell) (November 3, 1883 – June 24, 1979), was an American socialite who orchestrated the kidnapping, beating, and murder of a man who was wrongly accused of raping her daughter, Thalia Massie. After being convicted of manslaughter at her sensational trial, her ten-year sentence was commuted to a single hour by Hawaii's Territorial Governor Lawrence M. Judd.

== Early life ==
Grace Hubbard Bell was born November 3, 1883, in Washington, D.C. Her father Charles John Bell was first cousin of inventor Alexander Graham Bell. Her mother was Roberta Wolcott Hubbard Bell (1859–1885). Her maternal grandfather Gardiner Hubbard was the first president of Bell Telephone Company. When her mother died in childbirth in 1885, her father married her mother's sister, Grace Hubbard.

The family lived at Twin Oaks, their estate in the Cleveland Park neighborhood of Washington, D.C. Newspaper reports indicate that Grace could be classified a prankster: as a youth, she and her friends stole a trolley car for a joy ride through the streets of Washington and, on another occasion, she blocked traffic on Pennsylvania Avenue by joining hands with friends and roller-skating down the avenue.

== Personal life ==
In 1910, she married U.S. Army Major Granville "Rolly" Fortescue (1875–1952), one of the sons of Robert Barnwell Roosevelt. Her husband was first cousin of U.S. President Theodore Roosevelt. The marriage was not as financially successful as she would have wished. She was the mother of three daughters:

- Thalia Fortescue Massie (1911–1963), who married Thomas Hedges Massie (1905–1987), a Navy lieutenant.
- Marion Fortescue (1912–c. 1983), who married Daulton Gillespie Viskniskki in 1934.
- Kenyon Fortescue (1914–1990), better known as actress Helene Whitney; she married J. Louis Reynolds in 1936.

Outwardly, the Fortescues appeared to be wealthy country gentry. In reality, financial affairs became a primary concern for them after Granville's final retirement from the army. With the exception of a short stint as a fiction editor for Liberty magazine in 1930, he did not have steady employment, preferring to wait for the fortune his wife would inherit at the death of her parents.

=== Murder trial ===
In 1932, Grace Fortescue was charged with murder and convicted by a jury of manslaughter for the death of Joseph Kahahawai, one of the defendants in the alleged rape of her daughter Thalia in Hawaii in 1931. Also charged and convicted with Fortescue were two sailors, Edward J. Lord and Deacon Jones, and Fortescue's son-in-law, Thomas Massie, who participated in the abduction and murder of Kahahawai.

Attorney Clarence Darrow defended Fortescue, Jones, Massie, and Lord. He subsequently obtained a commutation of their sentence (ten years' imprisonment for manslaughter) to a one-hour confinement in the executive chambers of Territorial Governor Lawrence M. Judd.

In 1966, while being interviewed by author Peter Van Slingerland, Albert O. Jones admitted that he was the one who shot Joseph Kahahawai.
