= Congregational-Presbyterian Church =

Historic church in Ohio, United States

- U.S. National Register of Historic Places
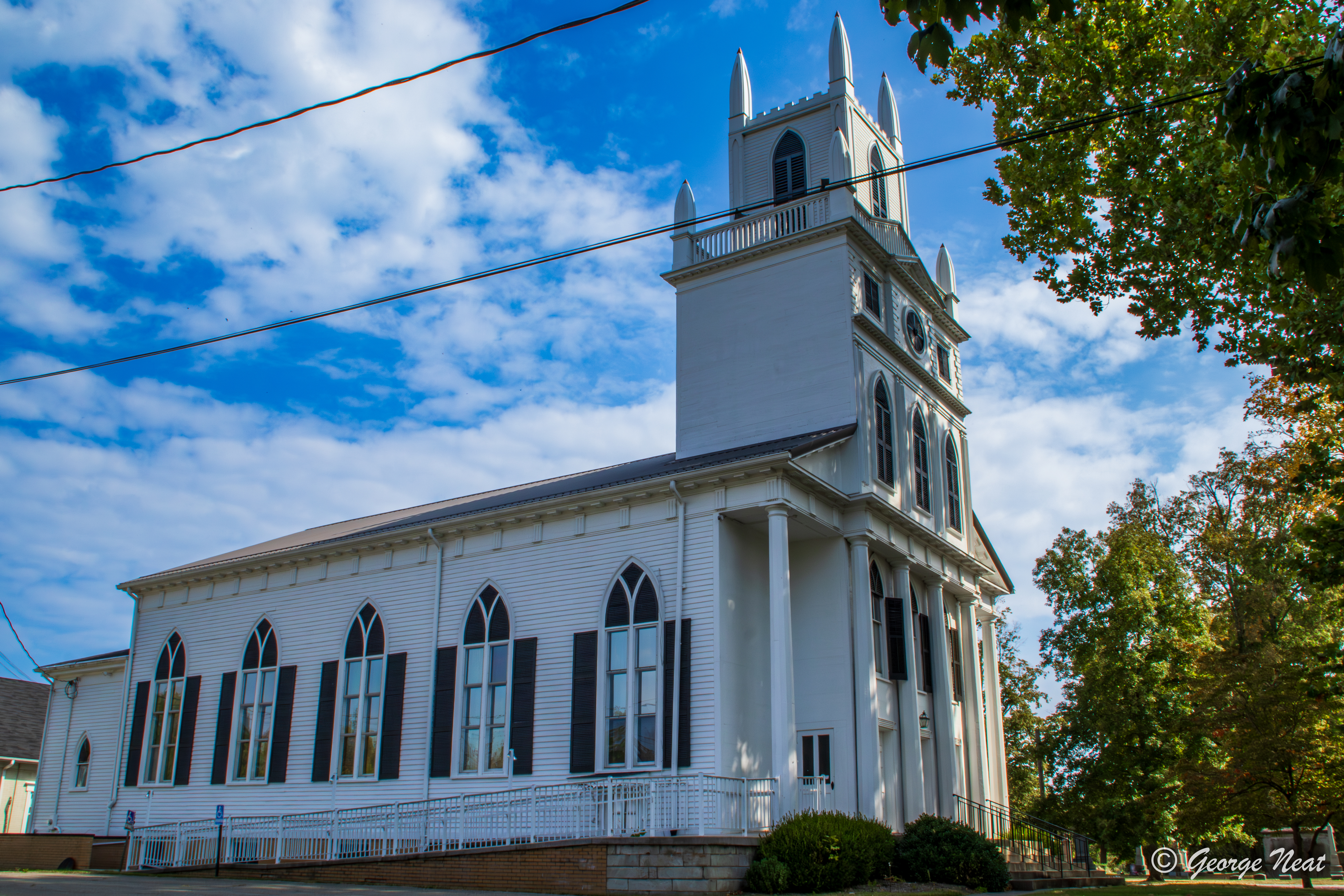

- Location within Ohio Location within the United States
- Location: Near OH 5 and 7, Kinsman, Ohio
- Coordinates: 41°26′53″N 80°35′6″W
- Area: 3 acres (1.2 ha)
- Built: 1831
- Architect: Smith, Will
- Architectural style: Greek Revival, Gothic
- NRHP reference No.: 71000654
- Added to NRHP: September 3, 1971

Congregational-Presbyterian Church (also known as the Presbyterian Church) is a historic church building near Ohio State Route 5 and Ohio State Route 5 in Kinsman, Ohio, United States. It is one of the oldest church buildings in Trumbull County.

The Greek Revival church building was constructed in 1831. The building was added to the National Register of Historic Places in 1971.
