= Lawrence M. Judd =

American politician

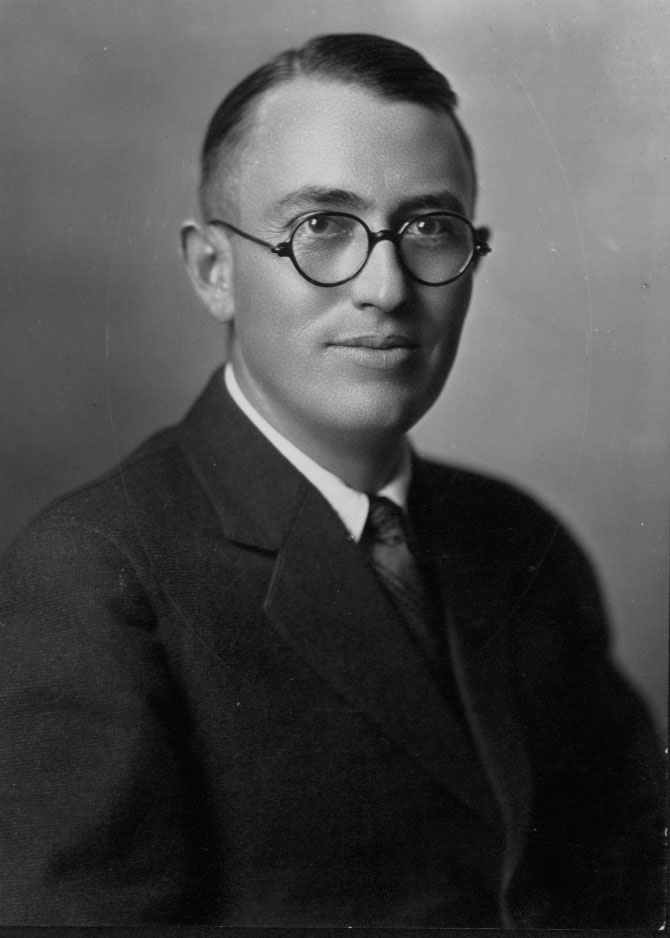
- Judd as Senator in 1920

Governor of American Samoa
- In office March 4, 1953 – August 4, 1953
- Appointed by: Dwight D. Eisenhower
- Preceded by: James Arthur Ewing
- Succeeded by: Richard Barrett Lowe

7th Territorial Governor of Hawaii
- In office July 6, 1929 – March 2, 1934
- Appointed by: Herbert Hoover
- Preceded by: Wallace R. Farrington
- Succeeded by: Joseph Poindexter

Personal details
- Born: Lawrence McCully Judd; March 20, 1887 Honolulu, Hawaiian Kingdom
- Died: October 4, 1968 (aged 81) Honolulu, Hawaii
- Resting place: Oahu Cemetery
- Party: Republican
- Spouses: Florence Bell Hackett; Eva Marie Lillibridge
- Relations: Bernice Judd (niece)
- Children: 5
- Parent(s): Albert Francis Judd; Agnes Hall Boyd
- Occupation: Politician

Lawrence McCully Judd (March 20, 1887 – October 4, 1968) was a politician of the Territory of Hawaii, serving as the seventh territorial governor. Judd is most well-known for his role in the Massie Affair, in which he commuted the sentence of three people convicted of manslaughter in the killing of Josef Kahahawai.

He later served as Governor of American Samoa from March 4 to August 4, 1953. As Governor of Hawai'i, his notable contributions included the establishment of public parks and numerous playgrounds, as well as reducing state spending. He also raised public awareness about the conditions in the leper colony on Moloka'i Island.

== Life ==
Judd was born March 20, 1887, in Honolulu, Hawaii, the grandson of Gerrit P. Judd, who was an early American Missionary, a cabinet minister to King Kamehameha III, and co-founder of Punahou School. His father was Judge Albert Francis Judd (1838–1900) and mother was Agnes Hall Boyd (1844–1934). He was the last of nine children. He was married March 6, 1909, at Richmond Hill, New York, to Florence Bell Hackett (1885–1974) and had five children: Helen Florence (1909-?), Agnes Elizabeth (1912-?), Sophie Janet (1913–?), Lawrence McCully Jr. (1917–?) and Emilie Bell (1920–?). Judd married his second wife, Eva Marie Lillibridge (1913–2002) in 1938.

Judd attended the Punahou School, The Hotchkiss School, and the University of Pennsylvania, where he was a member of its fraternity chapter of Phi Kappa Psi.

== Career ==
Judd made several fact-finding tours during his tenure in the Hawaii Territorial Senate 1920–1927.

=== Governor of HawaiI ===
Herbert Hoover appointed Judd to succeed Wallace Rider Farrington as the seventh Governor of Hawaii Territory from 1929 to 1934. As territorial governor, he overhauled the system of governance in the colony. A source of controversy during his tenure, Judd commuted the sentence of Grace Hubbard Fortescue, socialite and niece of Alexander Graham Bell, convicted in the territorial courts of manslaughter in the death of a local man, Joseph Kahahawai. Hiring defense lawyer Clarence Darrow, Fortescue's case was known as the Massie Affair, a focus of nationwide newspaper coverage. Massie's sentence of ten years in prison was whittled down to one hour in the governor's chambers at ʻIolani Palace. The affair was the subject of a 2005 episode of the PBS series The American Experience, which included archival footage of Judd.

=== Resident superintendent ===
Judd became Kalaupapa's resident superintendent in 1947.

Judd's service running Kalaupapa was a subject in the 2003 historical novel and national bestseller called Moloka'i by Alan Brennert as well as the historical account, The Colony: The Harrowing True Story of the Exiles of Molokai by John Tayman.

=== Samoa and retirement ===
On 4 March 1953, President Dwight D. Eisenhower appointed Judd Governor of American Samoa on a temporary basis. He served only five months.

Judd died on October 4, 1968, in Honolulu and was interred in the city's Oahu Cemetery in Nuʻuanu Valley.

Government offices
Preceded by Wallace R. Farrington	Territorial Governor of Hawaii; 1929–1934	Succeeded by Joseph Poindexter
Preceded by James Arthur Ewing	Governor of American Samoa; 1953	Succeeded by Richard Barrett Lowe
