= Farmdale, Ohio =

Unincorporated community in Ohio, U.S.

Coordinates: 41°26′13″N 80°36′29″W

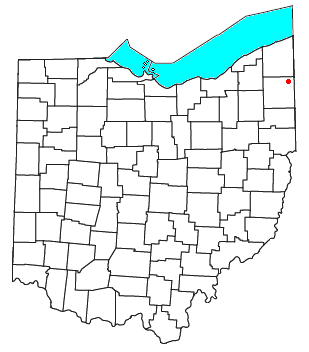
Location of Farmdale, Ohio

Farmdale is an unincorporated community in southwestern Kinsman Township, Trumbull County, Ohio, United States. It has a post office with the ZIP code 44417. The community is part of the Youngstown–Warren metropolitan area.
