= Joseph Kahahawai =

Native Hawaiian prizefighter (1909–1932)

Joseph Kahahawai Jr.
- Born: 25 December 1909; Maui, Territory of Hawaii
- Died: 8 January 1932 (aged 22); Honolulu, Territory of Hawaii
- Cause of death: Homicide (.32 ACP)
- Resting place: Puea Cemetery
- Other name: "Joe Kalani"
- Occupations: Boxer; Guardsman
- Known for: Rape suspect Homicide victim
- Criminal charge: Rape
- Criminal status: Mistrial (Hung jury)
- Parent(s): Joseph Kahahawai Sr. Esther Anito

Joseph Kahahawai Jr. (25 December 1909 – 8 January 1932) was a Native Hawaiian prizefighter accused of the rape of Thalia Massie. He was abducted and killed after an inconclusive court case ended with a hung jury mistrial.

== Early life ==
Kahahawai was born in rural Maui, 25 December 1909. His family moved to Honolulu and Kahahawai's parents divorced. He lived with his mother, who later remarried, while Kahahawai remained in contact with his father. He lived in the Kalihi-Palama area where he was part of the Kauluwela gang, in this case "gang" was simply known as a group of friends. After attending Kauluwela school, Kahahawai attended Saint Louis School through an athletic scholarship to play for the high school football team, building up a positive reputation. Due to the Great Depression, Kahahawai never graduated and worked various jobs. He also enlisted in the Territorial National Guard. As a boxer, Kahahawai fought both professionally under the name "Joe Kalani" and as a member of the 298th Infantry Regiment.

== Accusation of rape and subsequent trial ==
The Massie Trial was a 1932 criminal trial that took place in Honolulu. Socialite Grace Fortescue and several accomplices were charged with the murder of Kahahawai. Fortescue was the mother of Thalia Massie, who claimed that Kahahawai was one of a group of men who had raped her.

== Abduction and murder ==
With a hung jury – stymied by conflicting evidence – resulting in a mistrial, the defendants were released on bail to await a second trial. Though the second trial was to take place soon, many Non-Hawaiian community members felt that justice had not been served and a few of them decided to take things into their own hands. On January 8, 1932, Kahahawai was approached by Albert O. Jones with a forged summons document stating that Major Ross, Territorial Police Commander, needed to see him for questioning. Kahahawai was taken by Jones and Navy Lieutenant Thomas Massie, while Thalia Massie's mother, Grace Fortescue and Edward J. Lord followed close behind. Kahahawai was taken to the Fortescue's rented bungalow in Manoa where the group attempted to coerce a confession out of him at gunpoint. Although the exact circumstances of what happened are unclear, it is known that Kahahawai was killed by a single gunshot to the heart. The bullet severed his pulmonary artery, causing him to bleed to death.

Fortescue, Massie, and Lord headed toward Maunalua Bay in an attempt to get rid of the body. A police officer recognized the car as the one used to kidnap Kahahawai and forced it off the road. The naked body of Kahahawai lay on the floor of the car, clumsily wrapped in a damp sheet. Police later found Jones at the Massie house where they arrested him and took him in for further questions. Kahahawai's parents rushed to the station upon learning of their son's kidnapping and were devastated to learn that he had been murdered. They were escorted to the city morgue to identify his body.

At the Fortescue home, officers discovered two handguns, bloodstains on the floor, clothing belonging to Kahahawai, and the rope that was used to wrap his body. They also found the fake summons used to trick Kahahawai into the car.

Massie, Fortescue, Jones and Lord were charged with murder. Unlike other prisoners who await trial in jail cell, the four were allowed to stay on board a decommissioned Navy ship, the USS Alton, with comfortable accommodations and meals prepared for them. On April 4, 1932 the trial began. Each day the divorced parents of Joseph Kahahawai sat in the filled public section of the courtroom. There were so many reporters from around the nation that an adjoining room to accommodate them was opened. The jury consisted of six white men, two Chinese, and four part-Hawaiian men. There were no women on the jury. After several weeks, the trial came to an end and both sides gave their closing arguments. The jury deliberated for nearly forty-eight hours before reaching a verdict. The jury found all four guilty of the lesser charge of manslaughter. Leniency was recommended. On May 4, 1932, Judge Davis sentenced each of them to 10 years in prison with hard labor. The white population, heavily weighted by the American citizens of Naval Station Pearl Harbor and the businesses supporting it, was enraged. Under pressure from Rear Admiral Yates Stirling Jr., the commandant of the US Navy's 14th Naval District (including N.S. Pearl Harbor), and following threats that martial law might be imposed if the sentences were allowed to stand, Territorial Governor Lawrence M. Judd commuted the 10-year sentences of the convicted killers to one hour, to be served in his office. Aside from spending one hour in the palace, the four who killed Joseph Kahahwai were not punished. All four left Hawaii just days after sitting through their one-hour sentence, preventing the retrial of the four surviving defendants in the Massie rape case. Many years later, Lawrence Judd said he felt deep guilt over the commutation of their sentences. Thalia and Massie divorced in 1934; she committed suicide in 1963; he died in 1987. Grace Hubbard Fortescue died in 1979. Albert Jones died on September 23, 1966. Edward Lord died in 1967. Judd died in 1968. Stirling died in 1948. Darrow died in 1938. In 2006, Kahahawai and the other four accused were found not guilty after a posthumous trial.

== Funeral ==
Viewing of Joseph Kahahawai's body took place at the Nuʻuanu Funeral Parlor from Saturday evening until Sunday morning. Fearing a riot, the police, navy and territory officials stationed police officers at the funeral parlor all Saturday night. Police motorcycles escorted the funeral procession of more than a hundred cars to the downtown Fort Street Cathedral Basilica of Our Lady of Peace, where a Roman Catholic Requiem Mass took place. He lay in his coffin with bright orange and yellow Ilima lei around his neck as mourners moved slowly past for hours. The Cathedral was filled with people while hundreds were outside unable to get in. The large procession then walked to the nearby cemetery for the burial service. The crowd waiting there was so large that police had to make a path from the street to the grave site. Speaking in the Hawaiian language, Reverend Robert Ahuna of the Hoʻomana Naʻauao O Hawaiʻi performed the committal service at the Puea Cemetery in Kalihi-Palama where he was finally laid to rest on January 10, 1932. It was described as the largest funeral service held for any Native Hawaiian not of royal lineage. There were over two thousand people in attendance with Native Hawaiians making up the majority in the crowd. Kahahawai's father addressed the large crowd saying that after many conversations in which he demanded the truth from his son about the accusations of rape, his son swore an oath that he had done nothing wrong. The funeral service closed with hymns sung in Hawaiian, such as Kalani Kuʻu Home, Hawaiʻi Ponoʻi and Aloha ʻOe.
