= Robert Roosevelt =

American politician (1829–1906)

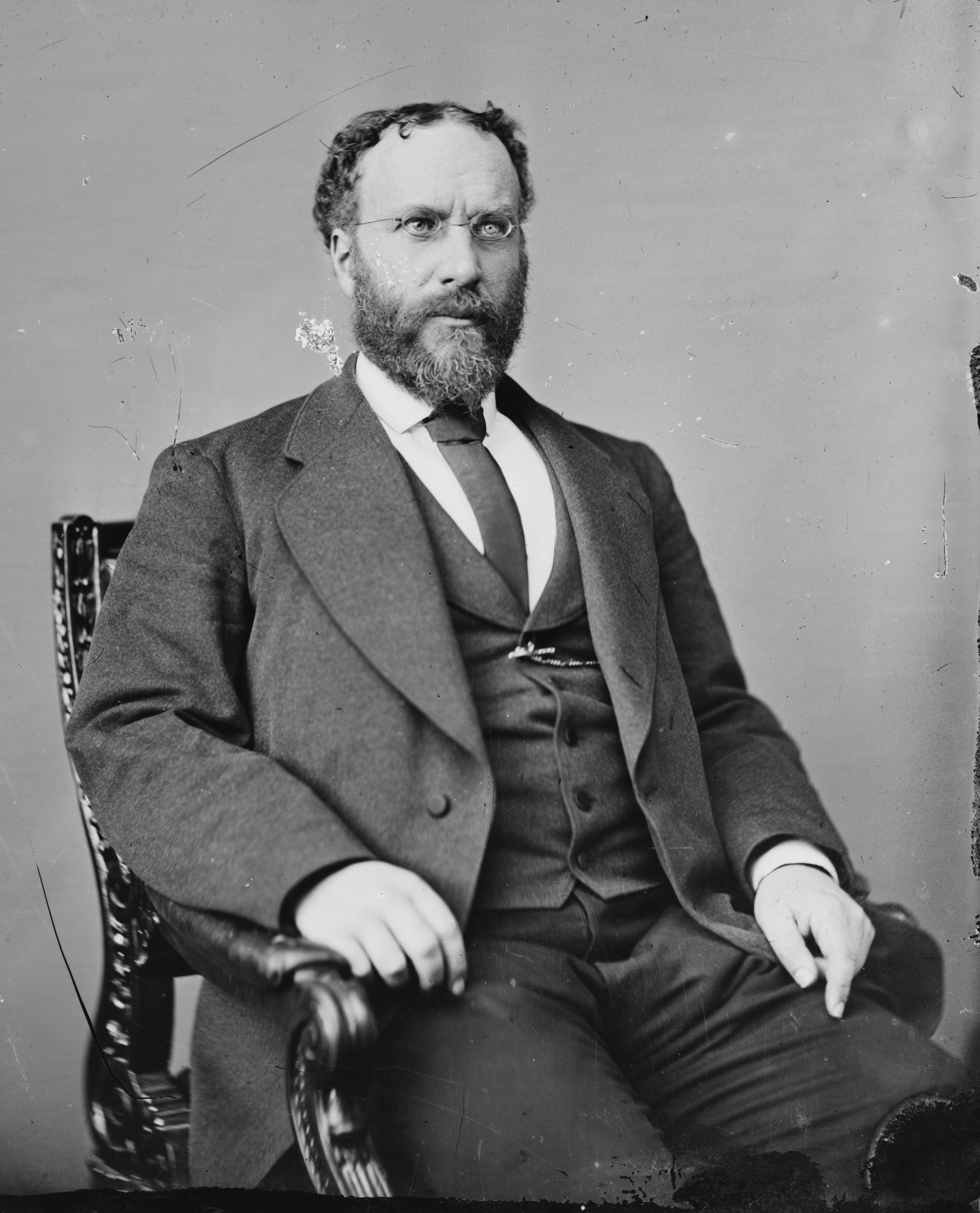
- Roosevelt, 1860–1875

Treasurer of the Democratic National Committee
- In office July 21, 1892 – June 26, 1896
- Preceded by: Charles J. Canda
- Succeeded by: William P. St. John

Member of the U.S. House of Representatives from New York's 4th district
- In office March 4, 1871 – March 3, 1873
- Preceded by: John Fox
- Succeeded by: Archibald M. Bliss

United States Ambassador to the Netherlands
- In office August 10, 1888 – May 17, 1889
- President: Grover Cleveland; Benjamin Harrison
- Preceded by: Isaac Bell Jr.
- Succeeded by: Samuel R. Thayer

Personal details
- Born: Robert Barnhill Roosevelt; August 7, 1829 New York City, US
- Died: June 14, 1906 (aged 76) Sayville, New York, US
- Resting place: Green-Wood Cemetery
- Party: Democratic
- Spouses: Elizabeth Ellis (m. 1850; died 1887) Marion Theresa O'Shea (m. 1888; died 1902)
- Relations: Roosevelt family
- Children: 6, including John and Granville
- Parent: Cornelius Roosevelt (father)
- Occupation: Attorney; politician
- Nicknames: Robert Barnwell Roosevelt; Robert Francis Fortescue

Robert Barnhill Roosevelt, also known as Robert Barnwell Roosevelt (August 7, 1829 – June 14, 1906), was a sportsman, author, and politician who served as a United States representative from New York (1871–1873) and as Minister to the Hague (1888–1889). He was also a member of the Roosevelt family and an uncle of US President Theodore Roosevelt.

== Early life ==
Robert Roosevelt was born in New York City to businessman Cornelius Van Schaack "C.V.S." Roosevelt and Margaret Barnhill. He had three elder brothers, Silas, James, and Cornelius Jr., and two younger brothers, Theodore and William. He was an uncle of President Theodore "T.R." Roosevelt Jr. and grand-uncle of First Lady Anna Eleanor Roosevelt. As an Oyster Bay Roosevelt, and through his ancestor Cornelius Van Schaack Jr., he was a descendant of the Dutch American Schuyler family.

== Career ==
Roosevelt studied law and was admitted to the New York State Bar in 1850. He commenced practice in New York City. During the Civil War, he was an active Democrat and a founder of the Allotment Commission and the Loyal National League.

His first experience in politics was in the organization of the Citizens' Association at the time of the Tweed Ring administration in New York City. For several years, he edited the organ of the Citizens' Association, the New York Citizen, at first with Charles G. Halpine, and after Halpine's death, by himself. He was a founder of the Committee of Seventy, and first vice-president of the Reform Club and the Holland Society of New York, to which he donated 200 volumes related to and by Hugo Grotius, later deposited at Columbia's Rare Books Library, becoming Holland Society President in 1890 following his return to the US as US Minister to the Netherlands.

Roosevelt was elected as a Democrat to the 42nd Congress (March 4, 1871 – March 3, 1873). Although the pressure of anti-Tammany Democratic organizations forced Tammany Hall to approve his nomination, he denounced its measures, and did much to contribute to the breaking up of the latter organization.

Roosevelt served as trustee representing the city of New York for the New York and Brooklyn Bridge from 1879 to 1882. He was instrumental in establishing paid fire and health departments in New York City. He was a member of the Board of Aldermen of New York City.

He was appointed by President Grover Cleveland as Minister to The Hague, serving from August 10, 1888, to May 17, 1889. He was treasurer of the Democratic National Committee in 1892. In 1893, President Cleveland appointed him the secretary of the embassy in London in exchange for a $10,000 campaign contribution.

=== Conservation ===
Roosevelt was an early angler and conservationist. He organized several clubs to restrain the indiscriminate slaughter of game. He is credited with influencing his nephew, Theodore Roosevelt, to become a conservationist. He founded the New York State Fishery Commission in 1867, and was appointed one of the three fish commissioners. He served as fish commissioner for 20 years, 1868–1888, without a salary. The reports of the commission were prepared chiefly by him, and led to the appointment of similar commissions in other states.

For many years, he served as president of the Fish Culture Association, of an association for the protection of game, of the New York Sportsman's Club, and of the International Association for the Protection of Game. He was a member of the American Association for the Advancement of Science. As a member of the U.S. Congress, he originated the bill to create the United States Fish Commission.

=== Writer ===
Roosevelt was a popular author and a friend of writers such as Oscar Wilde. He sometimes wrote under the pseudonym Barnwell or Ira Zell. He edited Political Works of Charles G. Halpine, supplying a memoir (1869).

Robert's nephew Theodore Jr. credited him with being the first to scribe the "Br'er Rabbit" stories (which had been passed down orally by slaves), publishing them in Harper's, where they fell flat. This was a good many years before Joel Chandler Harris published the stories in The Atlanta Journal in 1879.

== Personal life and death ==
In 1850, Roosevelt married to Elizabeth Ellis (1829–1887), a descendant of the Livingston family who was the daughter of John French Ellis (1794–1853) and Eliza Glen Thorn (1796–1855). Together, they were the parents of:

- Margaret Barnhill Roosevelt (1851–1927), who married Augustus Van Horne Kimberly (1845–1927) in 1889.
- John Ellis Roosevelt (1853–1939), who in 1879 married Nannie Mitchell Vance (1860–1912), daughter of Hon. Samuel B. H. Vance, at the recently built St. Nicholas Collegiate Reformed Protestant Dutch Church, Fifth Avenue and 48th Street, in New York City. Vance, who was active in New York State Republican politics, was a manufacturer who served as Acting Mayor of New York City for the month of December 1874.
- Robert Barnhill Roosevelt Jr. (1866–1929)

Roosevelt purchased the Meadow Croft property at Sayville, New York, in 1873 and it was later developed by his son as the John Ellis Roosevelt Estate. It was added to the National Register of Historic Places in 1987.

After the death of his first wife in 1887, he married his mistress, Irish immigrant Marion Theresa "Minnie" O'Shea on August 18, 1888. Although his children with Minnie were his biological children, they had been born prior to his wedding to Minnie and were known as his stepchildren. They had been listed as having a father named "Robert Francis Fortescue", and maintained the Fortescue name throughout their lives. Together with Minnie, he was the father of:

- Kenyon Fortescue (1871–1939), who became an attorney.
- Major Granville Roland "Rolly" Fortescue (1875–1952), who married Grace Hubbard Bell (1883–1979), niece of Alexander Graham Bell.
- Maude Fortescue (1880–1961), who married Ernest William Sutton Pickhardt in 1900 and moved to London. Pickhardt was the son of Manhattan millionaire Ernest W. Pickhardt and the brother of Baroness Irene von Colberg. They divorced before Pickhardt's suicide in 1909. In 1945, she married Brigadier General Richard L. A. Pennington.

His second wife died on April 10, 1902.

Roosevelt was a member of the Order of the Founders and Patriots of America and served as its sixth Governor General in 1906 until his death.

=== Death and burial ===
Roosevelt died in Sayville, New York, on June 14, 1906, while his nephew was serving as President of the United States. His remains were interred in Green-Wood Cemetery in Brooklyn. His large estate was left to his family.

== Published works ==
- Superior Fishing; or The Striped Bass, Trout, Black Bass and Bluefish of the Northern States.
- Game Fish of the Northern States and British Provinces. (1862)
- Game Birds of the North (1866)
- Superior Fishing (1866)
- Florida and the Game Water Birds (1868)
- Five Acres Too Much, a satire provoked by Edmund Morris's Ten Acres Enough (1869)
- Progressive Petticoats, a satire on female physicians (1871)
- Fish Hatching and Fish Catching (1879)

Diplomatic posts
Preceded by Isaac Bell Jr.	U.S. Minister to the Netherlands; 1888–1889	Succeeded by Samuel R. Thayer
U.S. House of Representatives
Preceded by John Fox	Member of the U.S. House of Representatives from New York's 4th congressional district March 4, 1871 – March 3, 1873	Succeeded by Philip S. Crooke
