= Morag Clark =

British educationist

Dr. Morag Clark MBE
- Born: 19 March 1929; Glasgow, Scotland, United Kingdom
- Died: 9 April 2019 (aged 90); Hereford, England, United Kingdom
- Occupation(s): Educator, consultant
- Known for: Natural Auditory Oral Education

Morag Clark, MBE (19 March 1929 – 9 April 2019) was a British educator and pioneer of natural auditory-oral education for children with hearing impairments. The British Association of Teachers of the Deaf has stated that Clark "probably improved the life chances of more deaf children and supported more families all over the world than anyone else in the field of deaf education".

== Life and work ==
Morag Clark was born in Glasgow, Scotland, to a Baptist Minister's family. She was raised in Dunfermline and Motherwell, spending her school holidays with friends and family or on cycling trips across Scotland's islands and mainland.

Clark trained as a teacher at Jordanhill Training College and later at Manchester University to become a Teacher of the Deaf, earning a PhD In 1957, she became a teacher at the Birkdale School for Hearing Impaired Children in Southport, Merseyside. From 1976 to 1986, she served as the school's principal.

After her retirement from the school in 1986, Clark conducted by conducting workshops and courses for educators of the hearing impaired at Oxford Brooks University. She also supervised projects in Turkey, Japan, Singapore, Ecuador, Germany, India, Mauritius, Hungary, Canada, Singapore, South Africa, Zimbabwe, Tanzania, and Zambia. Among other projects, she implemented a program at Anadolu University in central Turkey. In 1989, she travelled to Ecuador to train specialists in deaf education. In 1998, she helped establish the Foundation for Children with a Hearing Loss in South Africa, founded in 1992, and assisted in setting up an integrated kindergarten. Clark died on 9 April 2019 at the Broomy Hill Nursing Home in Hereford.

== Natural Auditory-Oral Approach ==
Morag Clark developed the Natural Auditory-Oral Approach, which posits that deaf children can acquire fluent speech if their residual hearing is fully used in an interactive learning environment. This approach involves:

- Utilising significant auditory impressions from everyday situations for near-natural language acquisition
- Encouraging natural parent-child interactions and carefully selecting learning environments
- Beginning auditory education in infancy, with a focus on rhythm and speech melody
- Ensuring effective hearing aids through regular audiological checks

Clark documented case histories and provided guidance for adapting early intervention approaches, incorporating recent developments in audiology, technology, medical science, and psycholinguistics.

== Awards and honours ==
- In 1989 Queen Elizabeth II appointed her a Member of the Order of the British Empire (MBE) for her international services to the auditory education of hearing-impaired children.
- She received three awards from the Alexander Graham Bell Association for the Deaf and Hard of Hearing: Honours of the Association, International Meritorious Service Award, and Global Ambassador.
- Honorary doctorate from Anadolu University in Eskişehir, Turkey.

== Selected publications ==
- "Introduction: For which population is an auditory approach suitable?" The Volta Review: Vol. 88, N. 5, 1986.
- "Language through living: For hearing impaired children", 1989
- "An Overview of Educational Provision for Hearing-Impaired Children from 1950 to Present Day". Thieme Medical Publishers, Inc 1997
- A Practical Guide to Quality Interaction With Children Who have a Hearing Loss. San Diego: Plural Publishing Inc. 2006. ISBN 978-1-59756-112-9.
