= Charles J. Bell =

Charles J. Bell may refer to:

- Charles J. Bell (politician) (1845–1909), American politician; governor of Vermont
- Charles J. Bell (businessman) (1858–1929), Irish-American financier and businessman

== See also ==
- C. Jasper Bell (1885–1978), U.S. Representative from Missouri
