= AG Bell =

AG Bell may refer to:

- Alexander Graham Bell (1847–1922), scientist and inventor of the telephone
- Alexander Graham Bell Association for the Deaf and Hard of Hearing, or AG Bell, an American organization for deaf people
