= David Charles Bell =

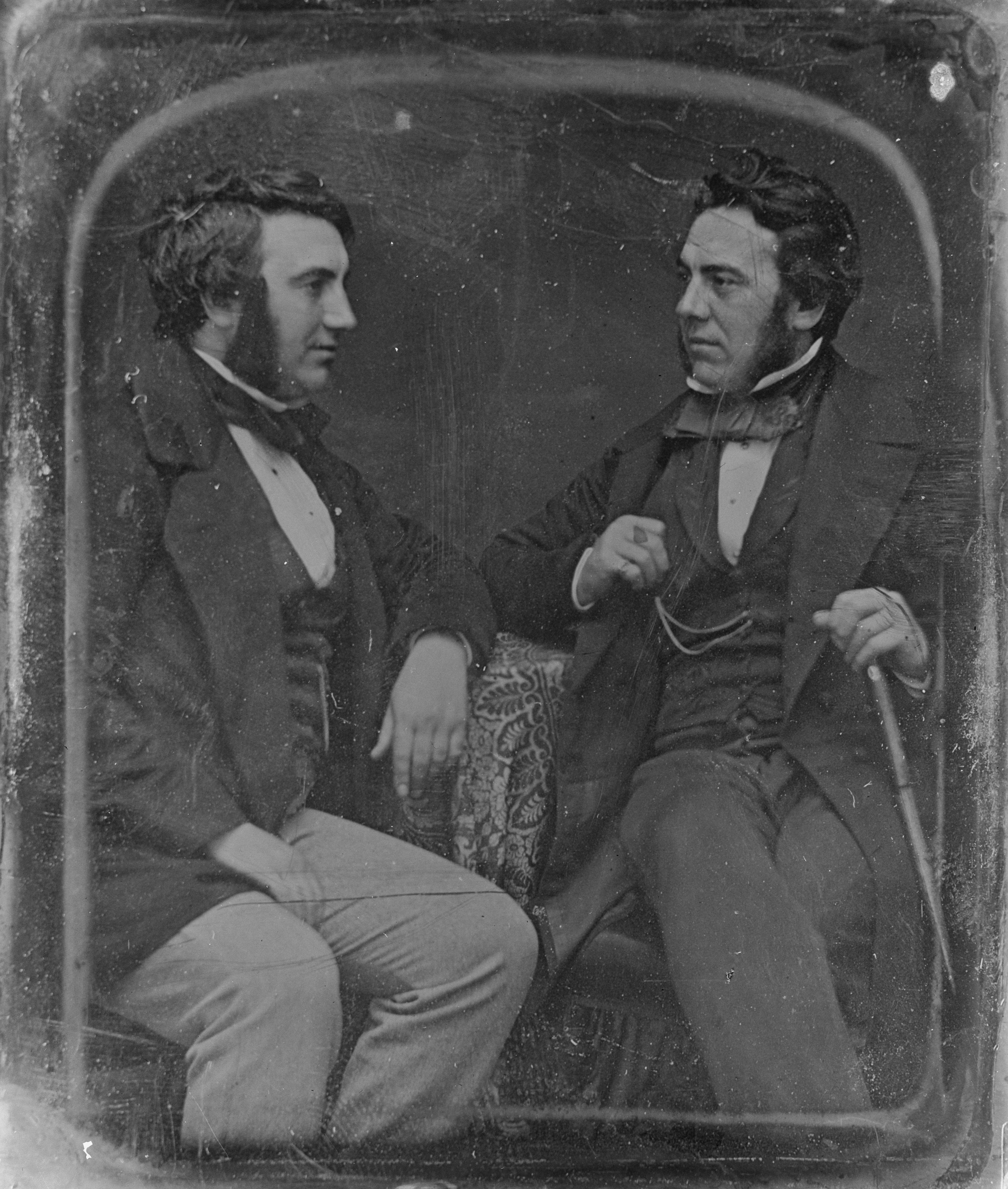
- Brothers Alexander Melville Bell and David Charles Bell
- Born: 4 May 1817; St. Andrews, Fife, Scotland
- Died: 28 October 1902 (aged 85); Washington D.C., U.S.
- Occupations: scholar; author; professor
- Spouse: Ellen Adine Highland
- Children: 11, including Chichester, Charles James
- Parent(s): Alexander Bell (1790–1865); Elizabeth Colville (d. 1856)

Professor David Charles Bell (4 May 1817 – 28 October 1902), was a Scottish-born scholar, author and professor of elocution. He was an elder brother to Alexander Melville Bell and uncle to Alexander Graham Bell.

== Professor of Elocution ==
Bell was born in St. Andrews, Fife, Scotland. He married Ellen Adine Highland and together they had eleven children. He later followed his brother Melville to Canada, emigrating from Ireland to Brantford, Ontario along with his wife and several of his children, including Aileen, Lilly, Laura and Charles James. His family's vocations and activities were highly similar to Melville's, its member's being gifted in music and elocution. As did his younger brother, David became a professor of elocution, providing lectures on proper speech.

David Charles, Professor of English Literature and Elocution, had previously taught at Trinity College Dublin, where one of his students was playwright George Bernard Shaw, whom he later introduced to Melville. Shaw, under Melville's influence was inspired to write the play Pygmalion (which spawned the musical production and movie My Fair Lady and refers directly to "Bell's Visible Speech"), and also became a life-long advocate of phonetic transcription —leaving a large part of his estate to the development of a "phonetic alfabet". Shaw remembered David Charles as a "majestic and imposing looking man".

While residing at Brantford, Ontario, Bell was an assistant to an important early test of the telephone, newly invented by his nephew Alexander Graham. Bell spoke to his nephew from the Brantford telegraph office, reciting lines from Shakespeare's Hamlet ("To be or not to be...."). The young inventor, positioned at the A. Wallis Ellis store in the neighbouring community of Mount Pleasant, listened to his uncle's voice emanating from his receiver housed in a metal box. Initially David Bell's voice couldn't be heard distinctly as "...all kinds and sizes of wire were used in stringing from the house to Mount Pleasant road." However, the Dominion Telegraph manager, Walter Griffin, decided to attach the wire to a telegraph battery to see if it would improve the transmission, which it did, and then "the voices then came in distinctly." (Note: Alexander Graham may also have transferred his uncle's voice onto a phonautogram, a drawing made on a pen-like recording device that could produce the shapes of sound waves as waveforms onto smoked glass or other media by tracing their vibrations. A phonautogram exists of the phrase "To Be Or Not To Be", published in a book coauthored by Melville Bell, Pioneering The Telephone in Canada, but was referred to as an 'oscilligraph' (sic). The phonautogram's source is not specified and it may have been subsequently produced elsewhere.)

David's son Charles James Bell (Dublin, 12 April 1858 – 1 October 1929) would marry Roberta Wolcott Hubbard (4 June 1859 – 4 July 1885), and then Grace Blatchford Hubbard (9 October 1861 – 16 July 1948), sisters of Mabel Hubbard (Alexander Graham Bell's wife), and become President of the American Security and Trust Company in the Washington, D.C. area.

David Charles wrote several works on elocution and speech, and in 1878 also co-authored Bell's Standard Elocutionist: Principles and Exercises along with his brother Melville. He died in Washington, D.C., age 86, and was survived by three sons and four daughters.

== Dublin arrest and confusion with the Irish Republican David Bell ==
In a biography of his nephew Alexander Graham Bell, Robert V. Bruce reports that in 1865 David Charles Bell was arrested in Dublin, but in explaining the circumstances appears to confuse David Charles with the Irish Fenian, Dr. David Bell (no relation).

In October 1864, Fenian "headquarters" in New York notified members of a lecture tour by David Bell from Ireland, anticipating that it would "have the most stirring and beneficial effect." Bruce suggests that "Whatever the effect of the tour (if it ever came off), one effect of the circular was to lodge David [Charles] Bell, in the Dublin House of Correction a year later, where he spent some time picking oakam." He quotes from a "letter from prison" to his brother Melville in which David Charles expresses ardent Irish nationalist sympathies: "I must bear it, still, however, looking forward to the proud watchwords--Ireland! Independence! No Saxon government, no base bloody whiggery... will depress my soul." Sources, including the recollections of Thomas Clarke Luby of the Irish Republican Brotherhood (IRB) and letters written to Luby from America, confirm that the lecture tour did take place, and that the lecturer was Dr David Bell, a former Presbyterian minister and Tenant Right League activist who had been inducted into the IRB by Jeremiah O'Donovan Rossa in the spring 1864.

If David Charles Bell had association with the IRB, it is possible that he was caught in the general round up of "Fenians" in the summer of 1865. Dr David Bell, at that time, evaded arrest escaping first to France and then back to the United States where he died in 1890.

== See also ==
- Bell Homestead National Historic Site, Branford, Ontario, Canada
- Volta Laboratory and Bureau, Washington, D.C.
