= Charles J. Bell (businessman) =

Irish-born American and Canadian businessman

Charles James Bell
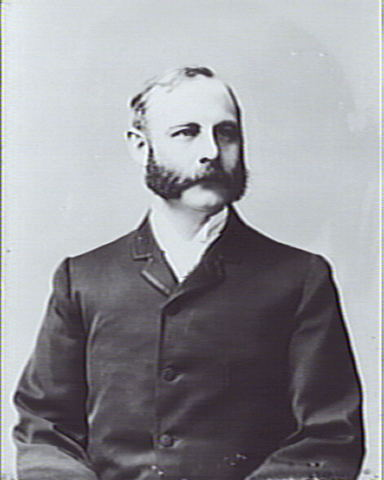
- Born: April 12, 1858; Dublin, Ireland
- Died: October 2, 1929 (aged 71); Manhattan, New York, U.S.
- Education: Wesley College
- Spouses: Roberta Hubbard (m. 1881; died 1885) Grace Hubbard (m. 1887)
- Children: 5
- Parent(s): David Charles Bell; Ellen Adine Highland
- Relatives: Chichester Bell (brother); Alexander Graham Bell (cousin)

Charles James Bell (April 12, 1858 – October 2, 1929) was an Irish-born Canadian and American businessman, first cousin of Alexander Graham Bell, son-in-law of Gardiner Greene Hubbard, nephew of Alexander Melville Bell. He was a co-founder of the National Geographic Society.

== Early life ==
Bell was born on April 12, 1858, in Dublin, Ireland, to Professor David Charles Bell (1817–1903) and Ellen Adine Highland. Among his family was brother Chichester Bell.

Bell attended Wesley College before emigrating to Canada in 1875.

== Career ==
Upon reaching Canada, he was employed by the Imperial Bank of Canada until 1879.

From 1880 to 1882, he was general manager of the National Telephone Company of England before moving to Washington, D.C., to be secretary of the new Bell Telephone Company, founded by his cousin, and organize the private banking firm of Bell & Co. Bell traveled to Paris to set up branches of the company in Europe.

In 1889 when the American Security and Trust Company of Washington was organized, Bell became vice president. Four years later, he became president (for thirty-five years) and in 1928 became chairman of the board of directors. He was also president of the Norfolk & Washington Steamboat Company, and was an incorporator of the American Red Cross, a trustee of the George Washington Memorial Association and of the American University, chairman of the Finance committee of the Public Library, and a member of the board of the Washington Sanitary Housing Company and of the Chapter of Washington Cathedral. He also served as chairman of the Potomac Electric Power Company and the Washington Railway and Electric Company, president of the Enquirer Building Company of Cincinnati, a director of the Terminal Refrigerating and Warehouse Company, Washington Market Company, Security Storage Company, Real Estate Title Insurance Company, Columbia Title Assurance Company, and Columbia Sand and Gravel Company, the Chesapeake and Potomac Telephone Company of New York and the three allied telephone companies and the Braddock Electric Light Company.

=== National Geographic Society ===
In 1888 Bell co-founded the National Geographic Society, and was its first treasurer. He bought the property for the headquarters of the society, where it still is.

== Personal life ==
In 1881, Bell married Roberta Hubbard, daughter of Gardiner Greene Hubbard. Together, they were the parents of:

- Helen Aidene Bell (b. 1882)
- Grace Hubbard Bell (1884–1979), who married Granville Roland Fortescue, a first cousin of Theodore Roosevelt.

After the death of Roberta during childbirth in 1885, Bell remarried to her sister Grace Hubbard in 1887. By his second wife, he was the father of:

- Gardiner Hubbard Bell (1890–1892)
- Charles James Bell (1891–1925)
- Robert Wolcott Bell (1893–1977)

He died at St. Luke's Hospital in New York City on October 2, 1929. His widow died in July 1948.
