= Charles Sumner Tainter =

American inventor and businessman (1854–1940)

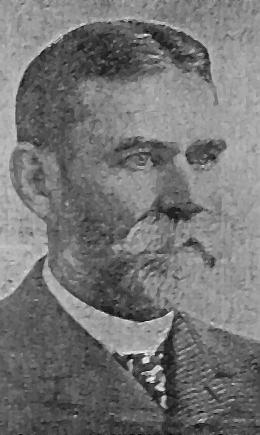
- Charles Sumner Tainter c.1886
- Born: April 25, 1854; Watertown, Massachusetts, U.S.
- Died: April 20, 1940 (aged 85); San Diego, California, U.S.
- Known for: Photophone, phonograph Father of the Speaking Machine
- Spouses: Lila R. Munro (m. 1886; died 1924) Laura F. Onderdonk (m. 1928)

Notes
- A voice recording of Tainter made sometime in 1885

Charles Sumner Tainter (April 25, 1854 – April 20, 1940) was an American scientific instrument maker, engineer and inventor, best known for his collaborations with Alexander Graham Bell, Chichester Bell, Alexander's father-in-law Gardiner Hubbard, and for his significant improvements to Thomas Edison's phonograph, resulting in the Graphophone, one version of which was the first Dictaphone.

Later in his career Tainter was associated with the International Graphopone Company of West Virginia, and also managed his own research and development laboratory, earning him the title: 'Father Of The Talking Machine' (i.e.: father of the phonograph).

== Biography ==
Tainter was born in Watertown, Massachusetts, where he attended public school. His education was modest, acquiring his knowledge mostly through self-education. In 1873, he took a job with the Alvan Clark and Sons Company producing telescopes in Cambridge, Massachusetts, which then came under contract with the U.S. Navy to conduct observations of the transit of Venus on December 8, 1874, resulting in Tainter being sent with one of its observation expeditions to New Zealand. In 1878 he opened his own shop for the production of scientific instruments in Cambridgeport, Massachusetts, where he made the acquaintance of Alexander Graham Bell. A year later Bell called Tainter to what would become his Volta Laboratory in Washington, D.C., where he would work for the next several years. He worked there alongside one of the first two woman medical doctors to graduate from Georgetown University, Nettie J. Sumner.

During this time, Tainter worked with the Bells on several inventions, amongst them the photophone and phonograph, which they developed into the Graphophone, a substantial improvement of Edison's earlier device, for which Tainter received several patents along with the Bells. Edison subsequently sued the Volta Graphophone Company (of which Tainter was part owner) for patent infringement, but the case was settled by a compromise between the two.

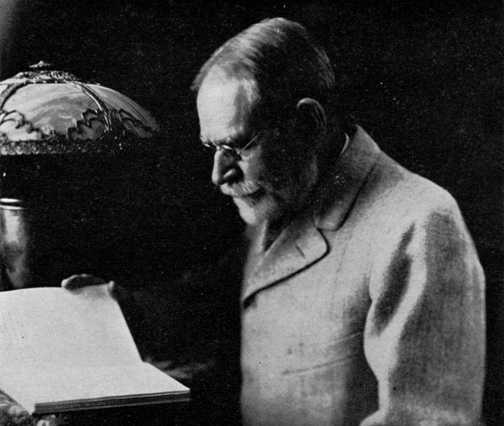
Tainter in 1919

In 1886, he married Lila R. Munro, and over the next years worked in Washington, perfecting his graphophone and founding a company trying to market the Graphophone as a dictation machine: the first Dictaphone. In 1887 Tainter invented the helically wound paper tube as an improved graphophone cylinder. This design was light and strong, and came to be widely used in applications far removed from its original intent, such as mailing tubes and product containers.

In 1888 he was stricken with severe pneumonia, which would incapacitate him intermittently for the rest of his life, leading him and his wife to move to San Diego, California in 1903. After the death of his first wife in 1924, he married Laura F. Onderdonk in 1928. Tainter received several distinguished awards for his graphophone.

== Unpublished work ==
In 1947 Tainter's widow, Laura Fontaine Onderdonk, donated a number of Sumner Tainter's unpublished writings, including the surviving Home Notebooks, to the Smithsonian Institution's National Museum of American History. The Home Notebooks contain daily agendas describing in detail the project work Tainter conducted at the Volta Laboratory during the 1880s. In 1950 Laura Tainter donated other historical items, including Sumner Tainter's manuscripts of "Memoirs of Charles Sumner Tainter", the first 71 pages of which detailed his experiences up to 1887, plus further writings on his work at the Graphophone factory in Bridgeport, Connecticut.

== Awards and honors ==
- The Electrical Exhibition in Paris awarded Tainter a gold medal for his co-invention of the photophone the previous year (1881);
- the French Government appointed him an "Officier de L Instruction Publique" for his work in the invention of the Graphaphone (1889);
- the San Francisco Exposition awarded him a gold medal for his Graphophone work (1915);
- the Panama Pacific Exposition also awarded him a gold medal for his work on the Graphophone (1915);
- the American Association for the Advancement of Science made Tainter an Emeritus Life Member of their institute (Pittsburgh, December 1934).

== Patents ==
Patent images viewable in TIFF format

- U.S. patent 235,496 Photophone Transmitter, filed September 1880, issued December 1880 (with Alexander Bell)
- U.S. patent 235,497 Selenium Cell, filed September 1880, issued December 1880 (with Alexander Bell)
- U.S. patent 235,616 Process of Treating Selenium To Increase Its Electric Conductivity, filed August 1880, issued December 1880 (with Alexander Bell)
- U.S. patent 241,909 Photophonic Receiver, filed March 1881, issued May 1881 (with Alexander Bell)
- U.S. patent 336,173 Telephone Transmitter (using a "jet of conductive fluid"), filed April 1885, issued February 1886
- U.S. patent 341,212 Reproducing Sounds from Phonograph Records (without using a stylus), filed November 1885, issued May 1886 (with Alexander and Chichester Bell)
- U.S. patent 341,213 Transmitting And Recording Sounds By Radiant Energy, filed November 1885, issued May 1886 (with Alexander and Chichester Bell)
- U.S. patent 341,214 Recording and Reproducing Speech and Other Sounds (improvements include compliant cutting head, wax surface, and constant linear velocity disk), filed June 1885, issued May 1886 (with Chichester Bell)
- U.S. patent 341,288 Apparatus for Recording and Reproducing Sounds (wax coated cylinder, pause and reverse mechanism), filed December 1885, issued May 1886
- U.S. patent 374,133 Paper Cylinder for Graphophonic Records (helically wound), filed April 1887, issued November 1887
- U.S. patent 375,579 Apparatus for Recording and Reproducing Speech and Other Sounds (with treadle drive designed for dictation), filed July 1887, issued December 1887
- U.S. patent 380,535 Graphophone (with duplicate transcription), filed December 1887, issued April 1888
- U.S. patent 421,450 Graphophone Tablet (hard "ozocerite" (carnauba wax) cylinder coating), filed November 1887, issued February 1890
- U.S. patent 428,646 Machine for the Manufacture of Wax-coated Tablets for Graphophones (helically wound paper tubes), filed June 1889, issued May 1890

== See also ==
- Alvan Clark & Sons, instrument makers
- Phonograph
- Photophone
- Volta Laboratory and Bureau, Alexander Graham Bell's research laboratory in Washington, D.C.
