= Volta Laboratory and Bureau =

U.S. National Historic research laboratory

- Volta Bureau
- U.S. National Register of Historic Places
- U.S. National Historic Landmark
- D.C. Inventory of Historic Sites
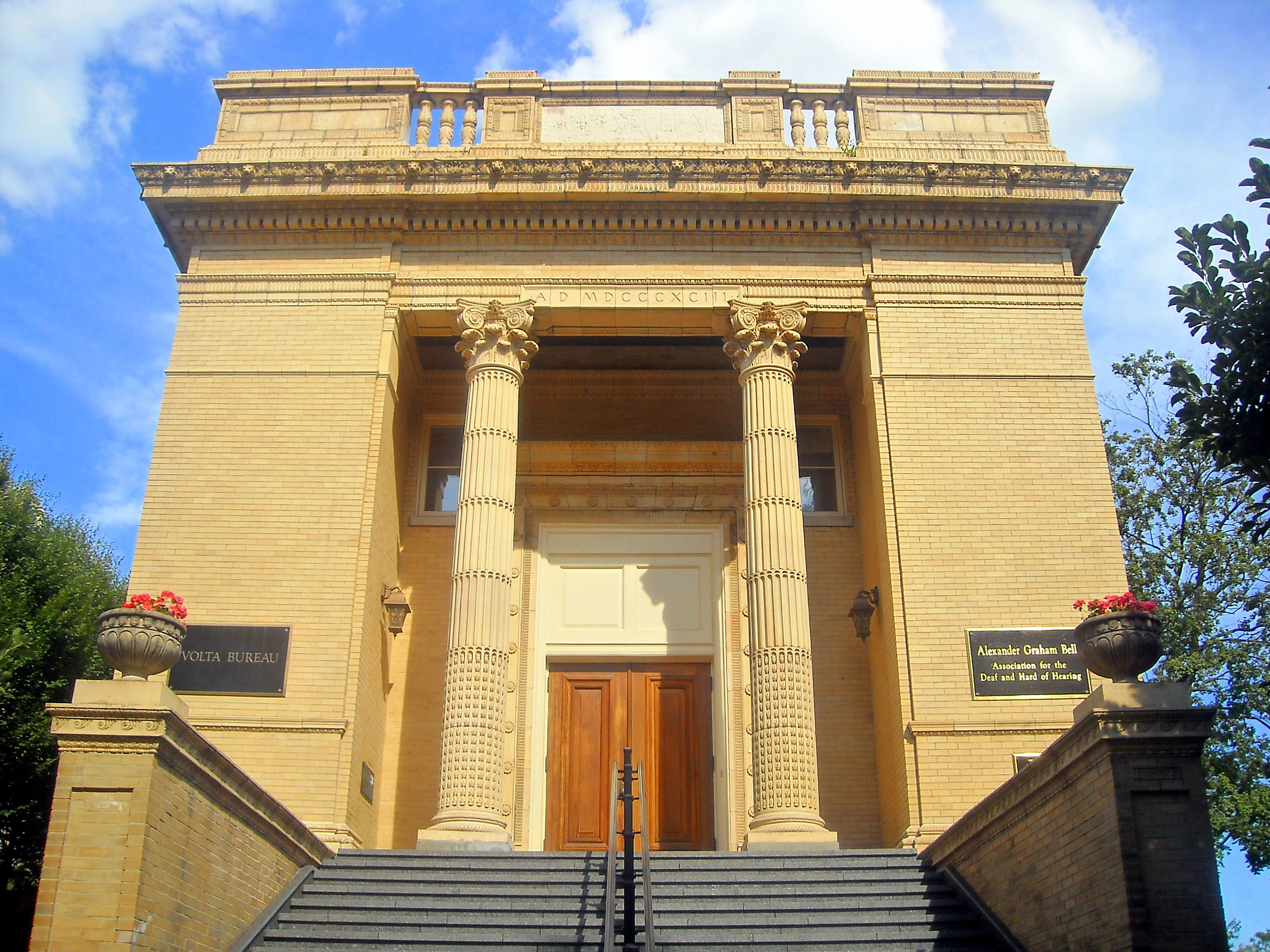
- Volta Bureau in 2008

- Location within Washington, D.C.
- Location: 1537 35th St. NW; Washington, D.C., U.S.
- Coordinates: 38°54′35.5602″N 77°4′8.3352″W
- Built: (1885) 1893
- Architect: Peabody and Stearns
- Architectural style: Neoclassical
- NRHP reference No.: 72001436

Significant dates
- Added to NRHP: November 28, 1972
- Designated NHL: November 28, 1972
- Designated DCIHS: June 19, 1973

The Volta Laboratory (also known as the Alexander Graham Bell Laboratory, the Bell Carriage House and the Bell Laboratory) and the Volta Bureau were created in Georgetown neighborhood of Washington, D.C., by Alexander Graham Bell.

The Volta Laboratory was founded in 1880–1881 with Charles Sumner Tainter and Bell's cousin, Chichester Bell, for the research and development of telecommunication, phonograph and other technologies.

Using funds generated by the Volta Laboratory, Bell later founded the Volta Bureau in 1887 "for the increase and diffusion of knowledge relating to the deaf", and merged with the American Association for the Promotion and Teaching of Speech to the Deaf (AAPTSD) in 1908. It was renamed as the Alexander Graham Bell Association for the Deaf in 1956 and then the Alexander Graham Bell Association for the Deaf and Hard of Hearing in 1999.

== History ==
The current building, a U.S. National Historic Landmark, was constructed in 1893 under the direction of Alexander Graham Bell to serve as a center of information for deaf and hard of hearing persons. Bell, best known for receiving the first telephone patent in 1876, was also a prominent figure of his generation in the education of the deaf. His grandfather, father, and elder brother were teachers of speech and the younger Bell worked with them.

Born in Edinburgh, Scotland, Bell moved to Canada with his family in 1870 following the deaths of his brothers, and a year later moved to Boston to teach at a special day school for deaf children. Both Bell's mother and wife were deaf, profoundly influencing his life's work. He became a renowned educator by opening a private normal class to train teachers of speech to the deaf and as a professor of vocal physiology and the mechanics of speech at Boston University. During this time he also invented an improved phonautograph, the multiple telegraph, the speaking telegraph, or telephone, and numerous other devices.

In 1879, Bell and his wife Mabel Hubbard, who had been deaf from early childhood, moved to Washington, D.C. The following year, the French government awarded Bell the Volta Prize of 50,000 francs (approximately US$350,000 in current dollars) for the invention of the telephone. Bell used the money to establish a trust fund, the Volta Fund, and founded the Volta Laboratory Association, along with his cousin Chichester A. Bell and Sumner Tainter. The laboratory focused on research for the analysis, recording, and transmission of sound. In 1887, the Volta Laboratory Association transferred the sound recording and phonograph invention patents they had been granted to the American Graphophone Company, which later evolved into Columbia Records. Alexander Bell bent on improving the lives of the deaf, took a portion of his share of the profits to found the Volta Bureau as an instrument "for the increase and diffusion of knowledge relating to the deaf".

The Volta Bureau worked in close cooperation with the American Association for the Promotion of the Teaching of Speech to the Deaf (the AAPTSD) which was organized in 1890, electing Bell as president. The Volta Bureau officially merged with the Association in 1908, and has been known as the Alexander Graham Bell Association for the Deaf since 1956, and then as the Alexander Graham Bell Association for the Deaf and Hard of Hearing since 1999. Informally it is also called the 'AG Bell'.

=== Transition from the Volta Laboratory to the Volta Bureau ===
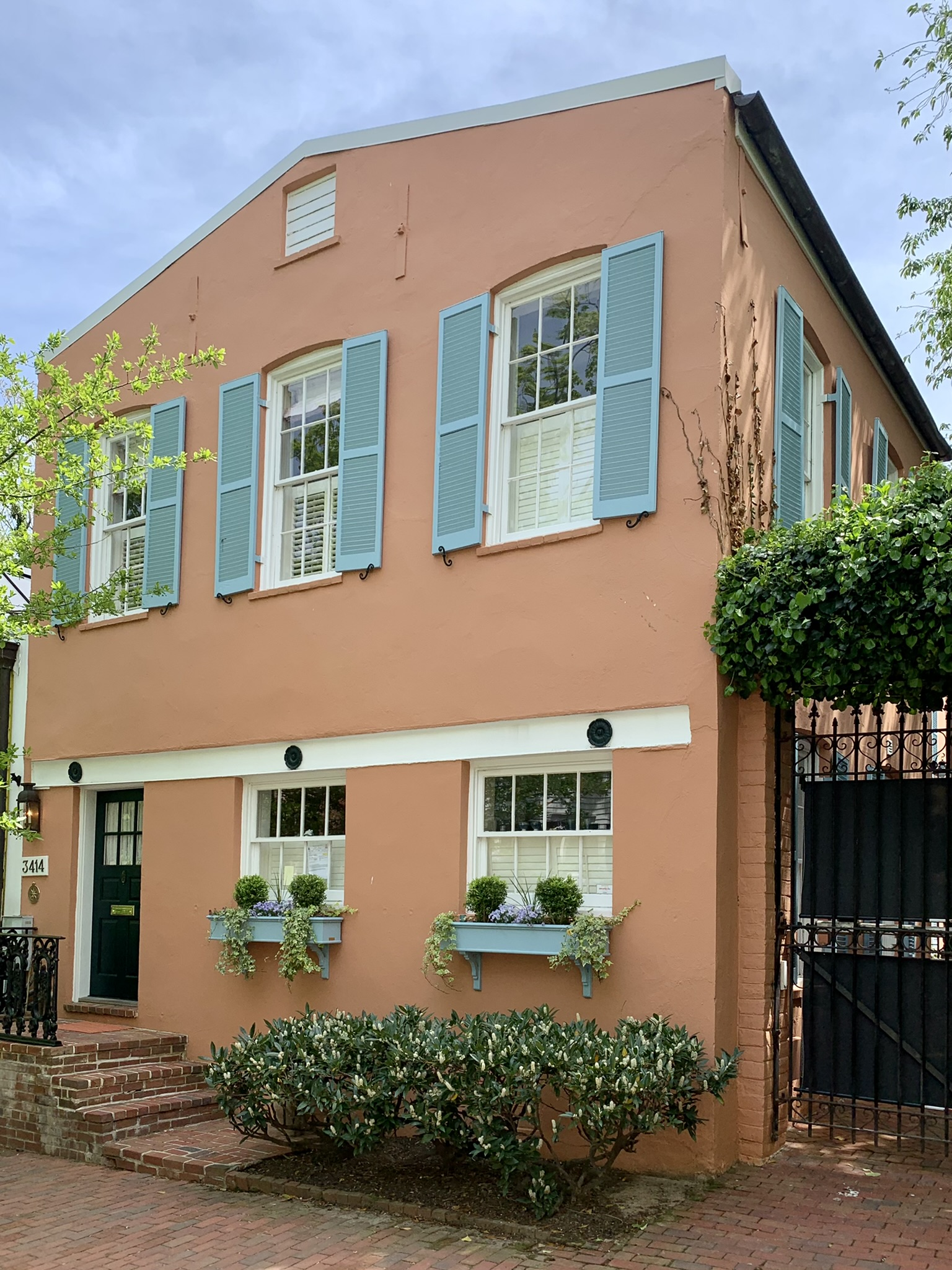
The Volta Laboratory used by Bell from 1885 to 1922

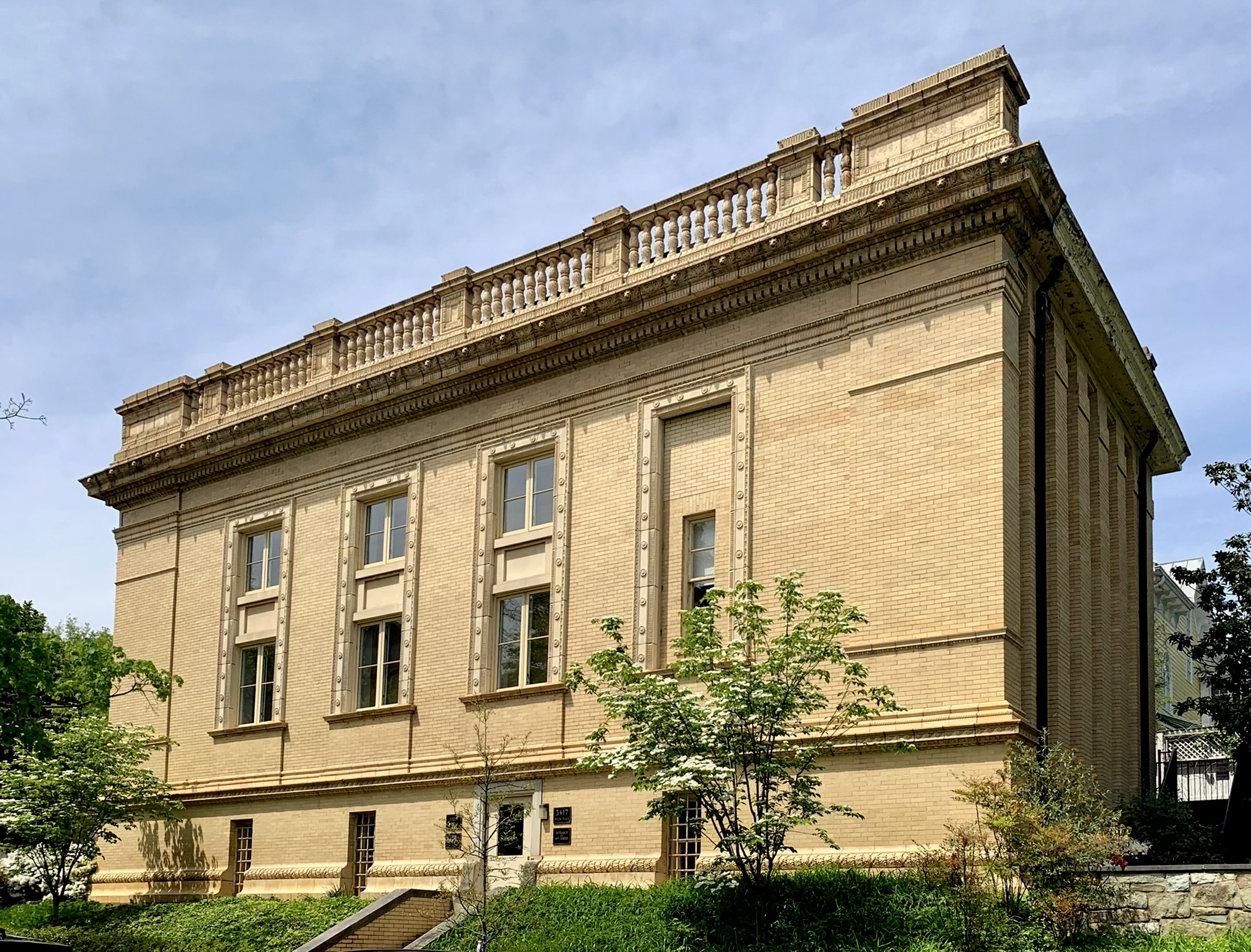
Side of the Volta Bureau in 2022

From about 1879 Bell's earliest physics research in Washington, D.C., was conducted at his first laboratory, a rented house, at 1325 L Street NW, and then from the autumn of 1880 at 1221 Connecticut Avenue NW. The laboratory was later relocated to 2020 F Street NW sometime after January 1886. With most of the laboratory's project work being conducted by his two associates, Bell was able to engage in extensive research into the causes of deafness as well as ways of improving the lives of the deaf, leading him to create the Volta Bureau in 1887. In 1889, Bell and his family moved from their Brodhead-Bell mansion to a new home close to his father, Alexander Melville Bell. Between 1889 and 1893, the Volta Bureau was located in the carriage house to the rear of the home of Bell's father, at 1527 35th Street NW in Washington, D.C. The work of the Bureau increased to such an extent that in 1893 Bell, with the assistance of his father, constructed a neoclassical yellow brick and sandstone building specifically to house the institution.

The new bureau building was constructed across the street from his father's home, where its carriage house had been its original headquarters. On May 8, 1893, Bell's 13-year-old prodigy, Helen Keller, performed the sod-breaking ceremony for the construction of the new Volta Bureau building.

The 'Volta Bureau' was so named in 1887 at the suggestion of John Hitz, its first superintendent, and Bell's prior researcher. Hitz remained its first superintendent until his death in 1908. Bell's former trust, the Volta Fund, was also renamed the Volta Bureau Fund when the Bureau was established, except for US$25,000 that Bell diverted to the AAPTSD, one of several organizations for the deaf that Bell ultimately donated some $450,000 (approximately $16,000,000 in current dollars) to starting in the 1880s.

The building, a neoclassical Corinthian templum in antis structure of closely matching golden yellow sandstone and Roman brick with architectural terracotta details, was built in 1893 to a design by Peabody and Stearns of Boston. Its design is unique in the Georgetown area of Washington, due to its Academic Revival style. It was declared a National Historic Landmark in 1972.

While the Volta Bureau's assigned mission was to conduct research into deafness as well as its related pedagogical strategies, Bell would continue with his other scientific, engineering and inventive works for the remainder of his life, conducted mainly at the newer and larger laboratory he built on his Nova Scotia estate, Beinn Breagh. Although Bell self-described his occupation as a "teacher of the deaf" throughout his life, his foremost activities revolved around those of general scientific discovery and invention.

By 1887 the Volta Laboratory Association's assets had been distributed among its partners and its collective works had ceased. In 1895 Bell's father, noted philologist and elocutionist Alexander Melville Bell, who had authored over 45 publications on elocution, the use of visible speech for the deaf and similar related subjects, assigned all his publication copyrights to the Volta Bureau for its financial benefit. The Volta Bureau later evolved into the Alexander Graham Bell Association for the Deaf and Hard of Hearing (also known as the AG Bell), and its works have actively continued to the present day under its own charter.

== Laboratory projects ==
The Volta Laboratory Association, or Volta Associates, was created by formal legal agreement on October 8, 1881 (backdated to May 1 of the same year), constituting the Volta Laboratory Association to be the owner of its patents. It was dissolved in 1886 when its sound recording intellectual property assets were transferred into the Volta Graphophone Company. The association was composed of Alexander Graham Bell, Charles Sumner Tainter, and Bell's cousin, renowned British chemist Dr. Chichester Bell.

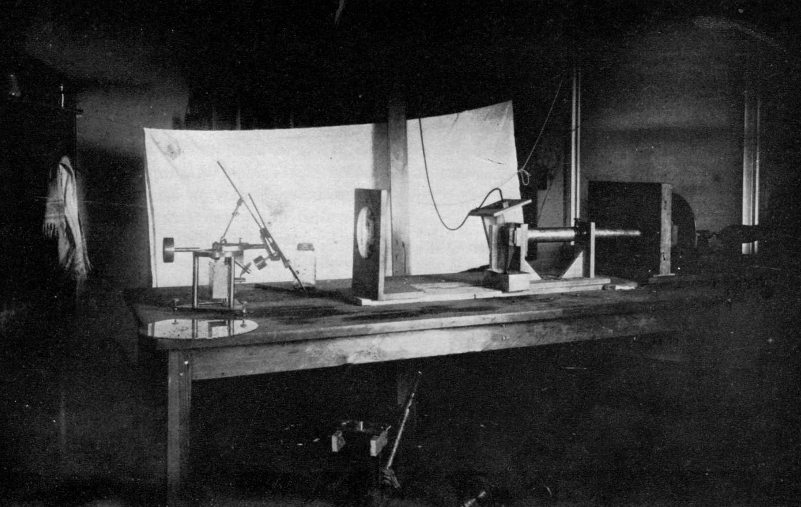
A rare 1884 laboratory photo showing the experimental recording of voice patterns by a photographic process (Smithsonian photo No. 44312-E)

During the 1880s the Volta Associates worked on various projects, at times either individually or collectively. Originally, work at the laboratory was to focus on telephone applications, but then shifted to phonographic research at the prompting of Tainter. The laboratory's projects and achievements included (partial list):

- the 'intermittent-beam sounder' – used in spectral analysis and in the generation of pure tones (1880);
- the Photophone – an optical, wireless telephone, the precursor to fiber-optic communications (February 1880);
- experiments in magnetic recording – attempts at recording sounds permanently fixed onto electroplated records (spring 1881);
- an artificial respirator that Bell termed a "vacuum jacket", created after one of his premature sons died due to his immature lungs (1881);
- the 'spectrophone' – a derivative of the Photophone, used for spectral analysis by means of sound (April 1881);
- an improved induction balance – an audible metal detector created in a bid to save President James A. Garfield's life (July 1881);
- a 'speed governor' for record players (fall 1882);
- the 'air-jet record stylus', an electric-pneumatic phonograph stylus designed to reduce background noise while playing a record, resulting in U.S. Patent # 341,212 granted on May 4, 1886 (known as the air-jet recorder) (November 1885);
- an audiometer – used in both telecommunications and to assist in studies of deafness,

"... as well as several other important, and commercially decisive improvements to the phonograph, during which they created the tradename for one of their products – the Graphophone (a playful transposition of phonograph)."

=== Tainter's move to the laboratory ===
Earlier Bell had met fellow Cambridge resident, Charles Sumner Tainter, a young self-educated instrument maker who had been assigned to the U.S. Transit of Venus Commission geodetic expedition to New Zealand to observe the planet's solar transit in December 1874. Tainter subsequently opened a shop for the production of scientific instruments in Cambridgeport, Massachusetts. He later wrote of his first meeting with Bell: "... one day I received a visit from a very distinguished looking gentleman with jet black hair and beard, who announced himself as Mr. A. Graham Bell. His charm of manner and conversation attracted me greatly. ... ".

Shortly after the creation of the Bell Telephone Company, Bell took his bride, Mabel Hubbard, to Europe for an extended honeymoon. At that time he asked Tainter to move from Cambridge to Washington to start up the new laboratory. Bell's cousin, Chichester Bell, who had been teaching college chemistry in London, also agreed to come to Washington as the third associate. The establishment of the laboratory was comparatively simple; according to Tainter's autobiography:

I therefore wound up my business affairs in Cambridge, packed up all of my tools and machines, and ... went to Washington, and after much search, rented a vacant house [at 1325] 'L' Street, between 13th and 14th Streets, and fitted it up for our purpose ... The Smithsonian Institution sent us over a mail sack of scientific books from the library of the Institution, to consult, and primed with all we could learn ... we went to work ... We were like the explorers in an entirely unknown land, where one has to select the path that seems to be most likely to get you to your destination, with no knowledge of what is ahead. In conducting our work we had first to design an experimental apparatus, then hunt about, often in Philadelphia and New York, for the materials with which to construct it, which were usually hard to find, and finally build the models we needed, ourselves.

Bell appeared to have spent little time in the Volta Laboratory. Tainter's unpublished manuscript and notes (later donated to the Smithsonian Institution's National Museum of American History) depict Bell as the person who suggested the basic lines of research, furnished the financial resources, and then allowed his associates to receive the credit for many of the inventions that resulted. The experimental machines built at the Volta Laboratory include both disc and cylinder types, with some of the disc type turntables rotating vertically about a horizontal axis, as well as a hand-powered, non-magnetic tape recorder. The records and tapes used with the machines were donated to the collections of the Smithsonian Institution's Museum of Natural History, and were believed to be the oldest reproducible bona fide sound recordings preserved anywhere in the world. While some were scratched and cracked, others were still in good condition when they were received.

=== Photophone ===
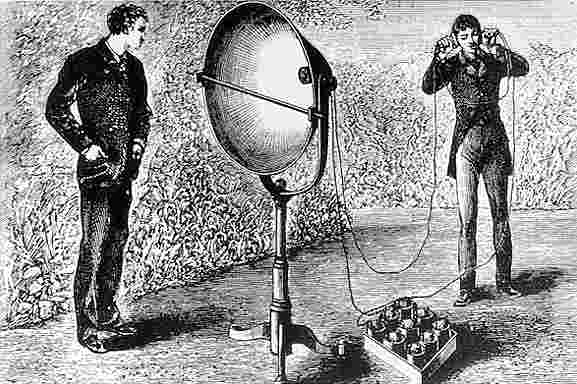
Bell and Tainter's Photophone receiver, one part of the device to conduct optical telephony

The Photophone, also known as a radiophone, was invented jointly by Bell and his then-assistant Sumner Tainter on February 19, 1880, at Bell's 1325 'L' Street laboratory in Washington, D.C.

Bell believed the photophone was his most important invention. The device allowed for the transmission of sound on a beam of light. On April 1, 1880, and also described by plaque as occurring on June 3, Bell's assistant transmitted the world's first wireless telephone message to him on their newly invented form of telecommunication, the far advanced precursor to fiber-optic communications. The wireless call was sent from the Franklin School to the window of Bell's laboratory, some 213 meters away.

Of the eighteen patents granted in Bell's name alone, and the twelve he shared with his collaborators, four were for the photophone, which Bell referred to as his "greatest achievement", writing that the Photophone was "the greatest invention [I have] ever made, greater than the telephone".

Bell transferred the Photophone's rights to the National Bell Telephone Company in May 1880. The master patent for the Photophone (U.S. patent 235,199 Apparatus for Signalling and Communicating, called Photophone), was issued in December 1880, many decades before its principles could be applied to practical applications.

=== Sound recording and phonograph development ===
==== Early challenge ====
Bell and his two associates took Edison's tinfoil phonograph and modified it considerably to make it reproduce sound from wax instead of tinfoil. They began their work in Washington, D. C., in 1879, and continued until they were granted basic patents in 1886 for recording in wax.

They preserved some 20 pieces of experimental apparatus, including a number of complete machines, at the Smithsonian Institution. Their first experimental machine was sealed in a box and deposited in the Smithsonian's archives in 1881 in case of a later patent dispute. The others were delivered by Alexander Graham Bell to the National Museum in two lots in 1915 and 1922. Bell was elderly by that time, busy with his hydrofoil and aeronautical experiments in Nova Scotia.

In 1947 the Museum received the key to the locked box of experimental "Graphophones", as they were called to differentiate them from Edison's 'phonograph'. In that year Mrs. Laura F. Tainter also donated to the Smithsonian's National Museum of Natural History ten bound notebooks, along with Tainter's unpublished autobiography. This material described in detail the strange creations and even stranger experiments at the laboratory which led to the greatly improved phonographs in 1886 that were to help found the recording and dictation machine industries.

Thomas A. Edison had invented the phonograph in 1877. But the fame bestowed on Edison for this invention (sometimes called his most original) was not due to its quality. Recording with his tinfoil phonograph was too difficult to be practical, as the tinfoil tore easily, and even when the stylus was properly adjusted, its reproduction of sound was distorted and squeaky, and good for only a few playbacks; nevertheless Edison had discovered the idea of sound recording. However, he did not work to improve its quality, likely because of an agreement to spend the next five years developing the New York City electric light and power system.

Meanwhile, Bell, a scientist and experimenter at heart, was looking for new worlds to conquer after his invention of the telephone. According to Sumner Tainter, it was due to Gardiner Green Hubbard that Bell took an interest in the emerging field of phonograph technology. Bell had married Hubbard's daughter Mabel in 1879 while Hubbard was president of the Edison Speaking Phonograph Company. Hubbard was also one of five stockholders in the Edison Speaking Phonograph, which had purchased the Edison patent for US$10,000 and dividends of 20% of the company's profits. But Hubbard's phonograph company was quickly threatened with financial disaster because people would not buy a machine that seldom worked and which was also difficult for the average person to operate.

By 1879 Hubbard was able to interest Bell in improving upon the phonograph, and it was agreed that a laboratory should be created in Washington, D.C. Experiments were also to be conducted in telephone and other telecommunication technologies such as the transmission of sound by light, which resulted in the selenium-celled Photophone. Both the Hubbards and the Bells decided to move to the nation's capital, in part due to the numerous legal challenges to Bell's master telephone patent of 1876. Washington was additionally becoming a center of scientific and institutional organizations, which also facilitated Bell's research work.

==== Graphophone ====
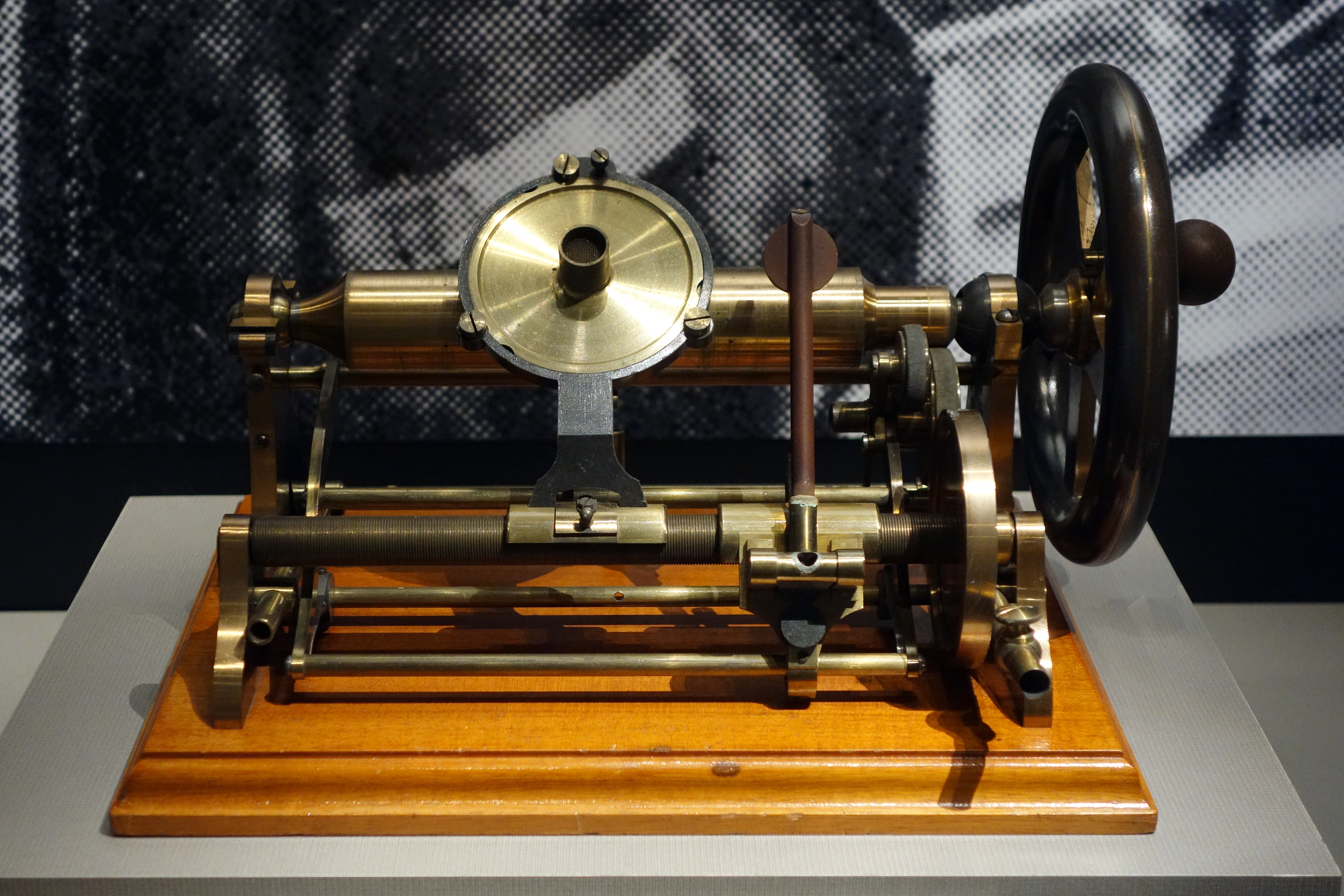
Prototype of Volta Lab graphophone, c. 1886 (National Museum of American History)

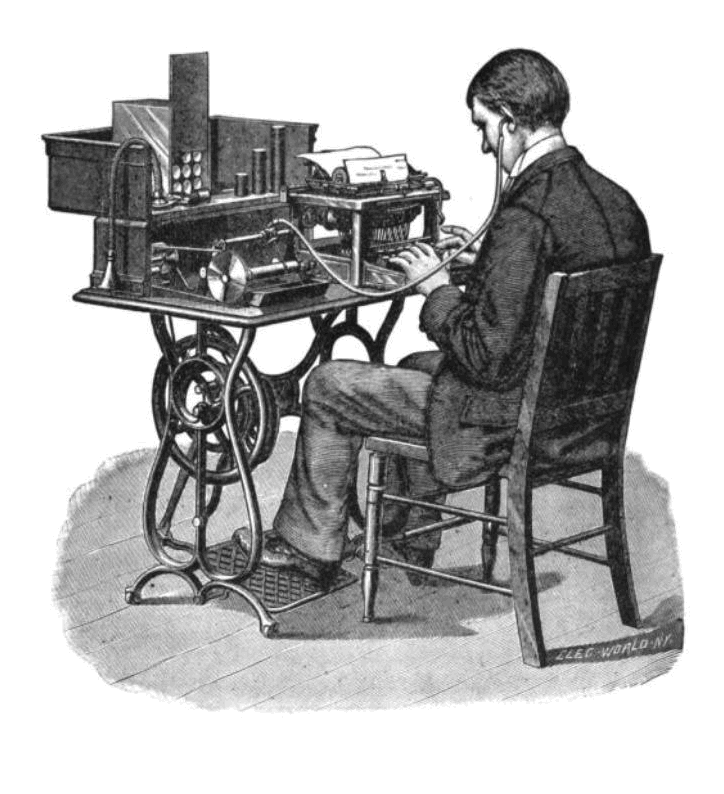
2 A 'G' (Graham Bell) model Graphophone being played back by a typist after it had previously recorded dictation

By 1881 the Volta Associates had succeeded in improving an Edison tinfoil phonograph significantly. They filled the groove of its heavy iron cylinder with wax, then instead of wrapping a sheet of foil around it and using a blunt stylus to indent the recording into the foil, as Edison did, they used a chisel-like stylus to engrave the recording into the wax. The result was a clearer recording. Rather than apply for a patent at that time, however, they sealed the machine into a metal box and deposited it at the Smithsonian, specifying that it was not to be opened without the consent of two of the three men. By 1937 Tainter was the only one of the Associates still living, and the box preserved at the Smithsonian was opened with his permission. For the occasion, descendants of Alexander Graham Bell gathered in Washington, but Tainter, who held a lifelong admiration of Bell, was too ill to attend and remained at home in San Diego.

A recording had been engraved into the wax-filled groove of the modified Edison machine. When it was played, a voice from the distant past spoke, reciting a quotation from Shakespeare's Hamlet: "There are more things in heaven and earth, Horatio, than are dreamed of in your philosophy ..." and also, whimsically: "I am a Graphophone and my mother was a Phonograph."

Believing the faint voice to be that of her father, Bell's daughter Mrs. Gilbert Grosvenor remarked: "That is just the sort of thing father would have said. He was always quoting from the classics." The voice was later identified by Tainter as in fact that of her paternal grandfather, Alexander Melville Bell. The historic recording, not heard since 1937, was played again in 2013 and made available online.

The method of sound reproduction used on the machine was even more interesting than the quotation. Rather than a conventional stylus and diaphragm, a jet of high pressure air was used. Tainter had previously recorded, on July 7, 1881:

"This evening about 7 P.M. ... the apparatus being ready the valve upon the top of the air cylinder was opened slightly until a pressure of about 100 lbs. [69 newtons/scm] was indicated by the gage. The phonograph cylinder was then rotated, and the sounds produced by the escaping air could be heard, and the words understood a distance of at least 8 feet from the phonograph." The point of the jet [nozzle] is glass, and [the air jet] could be directed at a single [record] groove.

The associates also experimented with other stylus jets of molten metal, wax, and water.

Most of the disc machines designed at the Volta Lab had their disc mounted on vertical turntables. The explanation is that in the early experiments, the turntable with the disc was mounted on the shop lathe, along with the recording and reproducing heads. Later, when the complete models were built most of them featured vertical turntables.

One interesting exception was a horizontal seven inch turntable. Although made in 1886, the machine was a duplicate of one made earlier but taken to Europe by Chichester Bell. Tainter was granted Patent No. 385886 for it on July 10, 1888. The playing arm is rigid except for a pivoted vertical motion of 90 degrees to allow removal of the record or a return to the starting position. While recording or playing, the record not only rotated but moved laterally under the stylus which thus described a spiral, recording 150 grooves to the inch.

The preserved Bell and Tainter records are of both the lateral cut and the Edison hill-and-dale (up-and-down) styles. Edison for many years used the "hill-and-dale" method with both cylinder and disc records, and Emile Berliner is credited with the invention of the lateral cut Gramophone record in 1887. The Volta associates had been experimenting with both types as early as 1881, as is shown by the following quotation from Tainter:

The record on the electro-type in the Smithsonian package is of the other form, where the vibrations are impressed parallel to the surface of the recording material, as was done in the old Scott Phonautograph of 1857, thus forming a groove of uniform depth, but of wavy character, in which the sides of the groove act upon the tracing point instead of the bottom, as is the case in the vertical type. This form we named the zig-zag form, and referred to it in that way in our notes. Its important advantage in guiding the reproducing needle I first called attention to in the note on p. 9-Vol 1-Home Notes on March 29-1881, and endeavored to use it in my early work, but encountered so much difficulty in getting a form of reproducer that would work with the soft wax records without tearing the groove, we used the hill and valley type of record more often than the other.

The basic distinction between Edison's first phonograph patent and the Bell and Tainter patent of 1886 was the method of recording. Edison's method was to indent the sound waves on a piece of tin-foil while Bell and Tainter's invention called for cutting or "engraving" the sound waves into an ozokerite wax record with a sharp recording stylus. At each step of their inventive process the Associates also sought out the best type of materials available in order to produce the clearest and most audible sound reproduction.

The strength of the Bell and Tainter patent was noted in an excerpt from a letter written by Washington patent attorney S. T. Cameron, who was a member of the law firm conducting litigation for the American Graphophone Company. The letter dated December 8, 1914, was addressed to George C. Maynard, Curator of Mechanical Technology at the U.S. National Museum (now the National Museum of Natural History):

Subsequent to the issuance of the Bell and Tainter patent No. 341214, Edison announced that he would shortly produce his 'new phonograph' which, when it appeared, was in fact nothing but the Bell and Tainter record set forth in their patent 341214, being a record cut or engraved in wax or wax-like material, although Edison always insisted on calling this record an 'indented' record, doubtless because his original tin-foil record was an 'indented' record. Edison was compelled to acknowledge that his 'new phonograph' was an infringement of the Bell and Tainter patent 341214, and took out a license under the Bell and Tainter patent and made his records under that patent as the result of that license.

Among the later improvements, the Graphophone used a cutting stylus to create lateral 'zig-zag' grooves of uniform depth into the wax-coated cardboard cylinders rather than the up-and-down hill and dale grooves of Edison's then-contemporary phonograph machine designs.

Bell and Tainter developed wax-coated cardboard cylinders for their record cylinders instead of Edison's cast iron cylinder which was covered with a removable film of tinfoil (the actual recording media) that was prone to damage during installation or removal. Tainter received a separate patent for a tube assembly machine to automatically produce the coiled cardboard tubes which served as the foundation for the wax cylinder records.

Besides being far easier to handle, the wax recording media also allowed for lengthier recordings and created superior playback quality. The Graphophone designs initially deployed foot treadles to rotate the recordings which were then replaced by more convenient wind-up clockwork drive mechanisms and which finally migrated to electric motors, instead of the manual crank that was used on Edison's phonograph. The numerous improvements allowed for a sound quality that was significantly better than Edison's machine.

==== Magnetic sound recordings ====
The other experimental Graphophones indicate an amazing range of experimentation. While the method of cutting a record on wax was the one later exploited commercially, everything else seems to have been tried at least once. The following was noted on Wednesday, March 20, 1881:

A fountain pen is attached to a diaphragm so as to be vibrated in a plane parallel to the axis of a cylinder—The ink used in this pen to contain iron in a finely divided state, and the pen caused to trace a spiral line around the cylinder as it turned. The cylinder is to be covered with a sheet of paper upon which the record is made. ... This ink ... can be rendered magnetic by means of a permanent magnet. The sounds were to be reproduced by simply substituting a magnet for the fountain pen. ...

The result of these ideas for magnetic reproduction resulted in patent U.S. patent 341,287, granted on May 4, 1886; which dealt solely with "the reproduction, through the action of magnetism, of sounds by means of records in solid substances."

==== Optical/photographic recordings ====
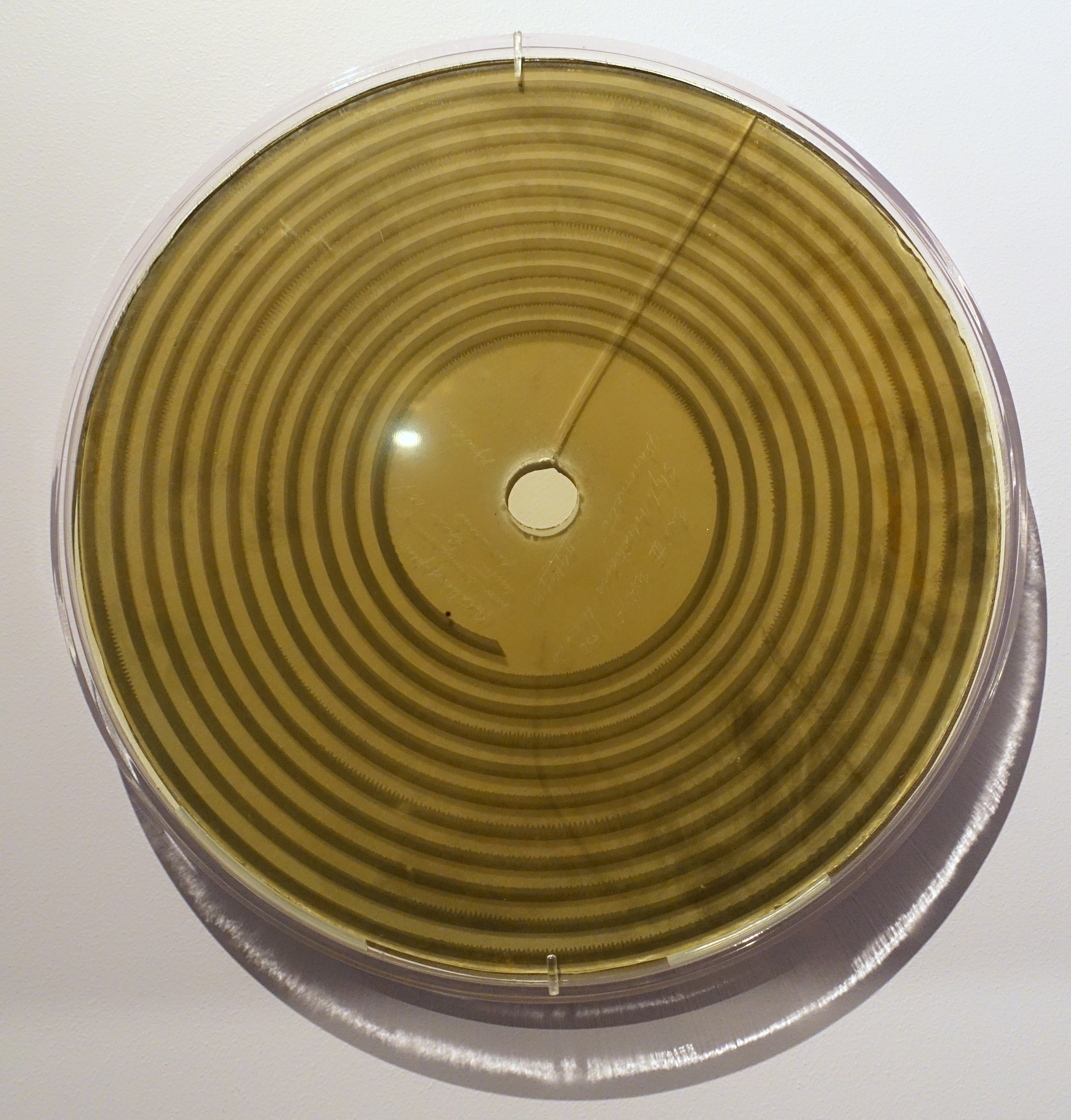
Glass phonograph disk with photographic emulsion, Alexander Graham Bell, made November 17, 1885 – National Museum of American History – DSC00110

The scientist at the Volta lab also experimented with optical recordings on photographic plates.

==== Tape recorder ====
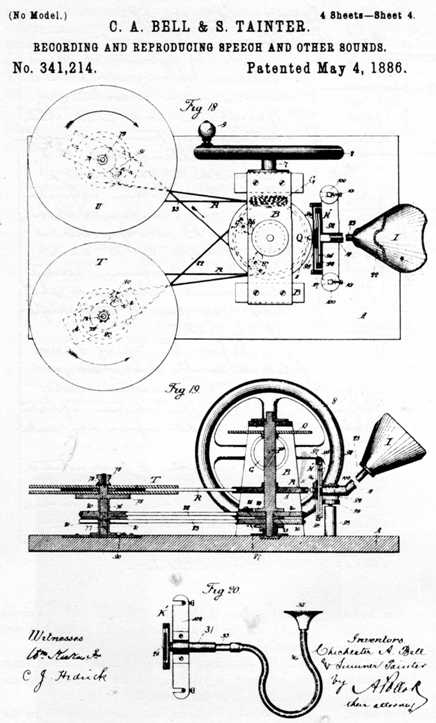
The patent drawing for an early hand-powered non-magnetic tape recorder

A non-magnetic, non-electric, hand-powered tape recorder was patented by two of the Volta associates in 1886 (U.S. patent 341,214). The tape was a 3/16 inch (4.8 mm) wide strip of paper coated by dipping it in a solution of beeswax and paraffin and then scraping one side clean before the coating had set. The machine, of sturdy wood and metal construction, was hand-powered by means of a knob fastened to a flywheel. The tape passed from one eight inches (20 cm) diameter reel and around a pulley with guide flanges, where it came into contact with either the recording or playback stylus. It was then wound onto a second reel. The sharp recording stylus, actuated by a sound-vibrated mica diaphragm, engraved a groove into the wax coating. In playback mode, a dull, loosely mounted stylus attached to a rubber diaphragm rode in the recorded groove. The reproduced sound was heard through rubber listening tubes like those of a stethoscope.

The position of the recording and reproducing heads, mounted alternately on the same two posts, could be adjusted so that several recordings could be cut on the same wax-coated strip. Although the machine was never developed commercially, it is interesting as a predecessor to the later magnetic tape recorder, which it resembles in general design. The tapes, when later examined at one of the Smithsonian Institution's depositories, had become brittle, the heavy paper reels had warped, and the machine's playback head was missing. Otherwise, with some reconditioning the machine could be put back into working order.

==== Commercialization of phonograph patents ====
In 1885, when the Volta Associates were sure that they had a number of practical inventions, they filed patent applications and also began to seek out investors. They were granted Canadian and U.S. patents for the Graphophone in 1885 and 1886 respectively. The Graphophone was originally intended for business use as a dictation recording and playback machine. The Graphophone Company of Alexandria, Virginia, was created on January 6, 1886, and formally incorporated on February 3, 1886, by another of Bell's cousins. It was formed to control the patents and to handle the commercial development of their numerous sound recording and reproduction inventions, one of which became the first dictation machine, the 'Dictaphone'.

After the Volta Associates gave several demonstrations in the City of Washington, businessmen from Philadelphia created the American Graphophone Company on March 28, 1887, in order to produce the machines for the budding phonograph marketplace. The Volta Graphophone Company then merged with American Graphophone, which itself later evolved into Columbia Records (co-founded CBS, and now part of the Sony media empire). Bell's portion of the share exchange at that time had an approximate value of US$200,000 (half of the total received by all of the Associates), $100,000 of which he soon dedicated to the newly formed Volta Bureau's research and pedagogical programs for the deaf.

The American Graphophone Company was founded by a group of investors mainly from the Washington, D.C. area, including Edward Easton, a lawyer and Supreme Court reporter, who later assumed the presidency of the Columbia Graphophone Company. The Howe Machine Factory (for sewing machines) in Bridgeport, Connecticut, became American Graphophone's first manufacturing plant. Tainter resided there for several months to supervise manufacturing before becoming seriously ill, but later went on to continue his inventive work for many years, as health permitted. The small Bridgeport plant which in its early times was able to produce three or four machines daily later became, as a successor firm, the Dictaphone Corporation.

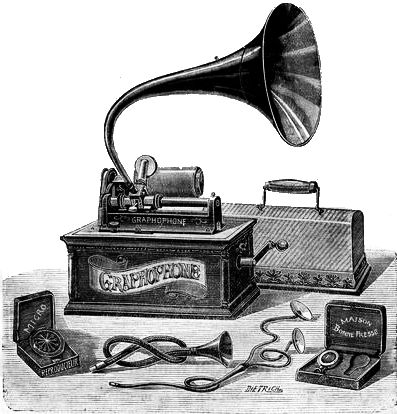
2A later-model Columbia Graphophone of 1901

Shortly after American Graphophone's creation, Jesse H. Lippincott used nearly $1 million (approximately $35,830,000 in today's dollars), of an inheritance to gain control of it, as well as the rights to the Graphophone and the Bell and Tainter patents. Not long later Lippincott purchased the Edison Speaking Phonograph Company, and then created the North American Phonograph Company to consolidate the national sales rights of both the Graphophone and the Edison Speaking Phonograph. In the early 1890s Lippincott fell victim to the unit's mechanical problems and also to resistance from stenographers. This would postpone the popularity of the Graphophone until 1889 when Louis Glass, manager of the Pacific Phonograph Company would popularize it again through the promotion of nickel-in-the-slot "entertainment" cylinders.

The work of the Volta Associates laid the foundation for the successful use of dictating machines in business because their wax recording process was practical and their machines were durable. But it would take several more years and the renewed efforts of Thomas Edison and the further improvements of Emile Berliner, and many others, before the recording industry became a major factor in home entertainment.

== Legacy ==
In 1887, the Volta Associates effectively sold their sound-recording-related patents to the newly created American Graphophone Company through a share exchange with the Volta Graphophone Company. Bell used the considerable profits from the sale of his Graphophone shares to found the Volta Bureau as an instrument "for the increase and diffusion of knowledge relating to the deaf", and also to fund his other philanthropic works on deafness. His scientific and statistical research work on deafness became so extensive that within a few years his documentation had engulfed an entire room of the Volta Laboratory in his father's backyard carriage house. Due to the limited space available there, and with the assistance of his father who contributed US$15,000 (approximately $540,000 in today's dollars), Bell had the new Volta Bureau building constructed nearby in 1893.

Under Superintendent John Hitz's direction, the Volta Bureau became one of the world's premiere centers for research on deafness and pedagogy for the deaf. Bell's Volta Bureau worked in close cooperation with the American Association for the Promotion of the Teaching of Speech to the Deaf (AAPTSD), which was organized in 1890, and which elected Bell its president. The Volta's research was later absorbed into the Alexander Graham Bell Association for the Deaf (now also known as the 'AG Bell') upon its creation when the Volta Bureau merged with the AAPTSD in 1908, with Bell's financial support. The AAPTSD was renamed as the Alexander Graham Bell Association for the Deaf in 1956.

The historical record of the Volta Laboratory was greatly improved in 1947 when Laura F. Tainter, the widow of associate Sumner Tainter, donated ten surviving volumes (out of 13) of Tainter's Home Notes to the Smithsonian Institution's National Museum of American History – Volumes 9, 10 and 13 having been destroyed in a fire in September 1897. The daily agenda books described in detail the project work conducted at the laboratory during the 1880s.

In 1950 Laura Tainter donated other historical items, including Sumner Tainter's typed manuscript "Memoirs of Charles Sumner Tainter", the first 71 pages of which detailed his experiences up to 1887, plus further writings on his work at the Graphophone factory in Bridgeport, Connecticut.

=== Bell's voice ===
The complete 1885 recording, along with what is being read

An excerpt of Bell's voice from the experimental wax disc (final words only)

Alexander Graham Bell died in 1922, and until recently no recordings of his voice were known to survive. (Note: In 1913 Bell's wife Mabel persuaded him to finally start using a Dictaphone voice recorder (a derivative of his own Graphophone technology) in Washington, D.C. Bell was averse to using his own recording devices, just as he avoided using the telephone he invented, letting his staff take and send messages unless there was an important issue to discuss. He also employed secretaries to assist in correspondence, one of them being his granddaughter, Dr. Mabel Grosvenor.) On April 23, 2013, the Smithsonian Institution's National Museum of American History, which houses a collection of Volta Laboratory materials, announced that one of its fragile Volta experimental sound recordings, a deteriorated wax-on-cardboard disc that can now be played safely by the IRENE optical scanning technology, had preserved the inventor's Scottish-tinged voice. Museum staff working with scientists at the U.S. Department of Energy's Lawrence Berkeley National Laboratory had also revived the voice of his father, Alexander Melville Bell, from an 1881 recording in the wax-filled groove of a modified Edison tinfoil cylinder phonograph.

Both Bells evidently assisted in testing some of the Volta Laboratory's experimental recorders, several of which used discs instead of cylinders. The 4 minute, 35 second test recording on the disc, mostly a recitation of numbers, is dated April 15, 1885, by an inscription in the wax and an announcement in the recording itself. It concludes with an emphatic spoken signature: "Hear my voice. ... Alexander. . Graham. . Bell."

After hearing the recording, Bell biographer Charlotte Gray described it, saying:

In that ringing declaration, I heard the clear diction of a man whose father, Alexander Melville Bell, had been a renowned elocution teacher (and perhaps the model for the imperious Prof. Henry Higgins, in George Bernard Shaw's Pygmalion; Shaw acknowledged Bell in his preface to the play). I heard, too, the deliberate enunciation of a devoted husband whose deaf wife, Mabel, was dependent on lip reading. And true to his granddaughter's word, the intonation of the British Isles was unmistakable in Bell's speech. The voice is vigorous and forthright—as was the inventor, at last speaking to us across the years.

== Location ==
The Volta Bureau is located at 1537 35th St. NW, or alternatively 3417 Volta Place NW, in the Georgetown district of Washington, D.C., near Georgetown University and across the street from Georgetown Visitation Preparatory School.

== Laboratory patents ==
Patents which resulted or flowed from the Volta Laboratory Association:

| Patent | Year | Patent name | Inventors |
|---|---|---|---|
| U.S. patent 229,495 | 1880 | Telephone call register | C. S. Tainter |
| U.S. patent 235,496 | 1880 | Photophone transmitter | A. G. Bell; C. S. Tainter |
| U.S. patent 235,497 | 1880 | Selenium cells | A. G. Bell; C. S. Tainter |
| U.S. patent 235,590 | 1880 | Selenium cells | C. S. Tainter |
| U.S. patent 241,909 | 1881 | Photophonic receiver | A. G. Bell; C. S. Tainter |
| U.S. patent 243,657 | 1881 | Telephone transmitter | C. S. Tainter |
| U.S. patent 289,725 | 1883 | Electric conductor | C. S. Tainter |
| U.S. patent 336,081 | 1886 | Transmitter for electric telephone lines | C. A. Bell |
| U.S. patent 336,082 | 1886 | Jet microphone for transmitting sounds by means of jets | C. A. Bell |
| U.S. patent 336,083 | 1886 | Telephone transmitter | C. A. Bell |
| U.S. patent 336,173 | 1886 | Telephone transmitter | C. S. Tainter |
| U.S. patent 341,212 | 1886 | Reproducing sounds from phonograph records | A. G. Bell; C. A. Bell; C. S. Tainter |
| U.S. patent 341,213 | 1886 | Reproducing and recording sounds by radiant energy | A. G. Bell; C. A. Bell; C. S. Tainter |
| U.S. patent 341,214 | 1886 | Recording and reproducing speech and other sounds | C. A. Bell; C. S. Tainter |
| U.S. patent 341,287 | 1886 | Recording and reproducing sounds | C. S. Tainter |
| U.S. patent 341,288 | 1886 | Apparatus for recording and reproducing sounds | C. S. Tainter |
| U.S. patent 374,133 | 1887 | Paper cylinder for graphophonic records | C. S. Tainter |
| U.S. patent 375,579 | 1887 | Apparatus for recording and reproducing speech ... | C. S. Tainter |
| U.S. patent 380,535 | 1888 | Graphophone | C. S. Tainter |
| U.S. patent 385,886 | 1888 | Graphophone | C. S. Tainter |
| U.S. patent 385,887 | 1888 | Graphophonic tablet | C. S. Tainter |
| U.S. patent 388,462 | 1888 | Machine for making paper tubes | C. S. Tainter |
| U.S. patent 392,763 | 1888 | Mounting for diaphragms for acoustical instruments | C. S. Tainter |
| U.S. patent 393,190 | 1888 | Tablet for use in graphophones | C. S. Tainter |
| U.S. patent 393,191 | 1888 | Support for graphophonic tablets | C. S. Tainter |
| U.S. patent 416,969 | 1889 | Speed regulator | C. S. Tainter |
| U.S. patent 421,450 | 1890 | Graphophone tablet | C. S. Tainter |
| U.S. patent 428,646 | 1890 | Machine for the manufacture of wax coated tablets ... | C. S. Tainter |
| U.S. patent 506,348 | 1893 | Coin controlled graphophone | C. S. Tainter |
| U.S. patent 510,656 | 1893 | Reproducer for graphophones | C. S. Tainter |
| U.S. patent 670,442 | 1901 | Graphophone record duplicating machine | C. S. Tainter |
| U.S. patent 730,986 | 1903 | Graphophone | C. S. Tainter |

== See also ==
- Alexander Graham Bell Association for the Deaf and Hard of Hearing
- Alexander Graham Bell honors and tributes
- Beinn Bhreagh – Bell's country estate in Nova Scotia, where he established a second, larger laboratory
- Bell Labs – although not directly related to each other, AT&T, founder of the Bell Laboratories of 1925, and the Bell Laboratory (the Volta's alternate name), both owed their creation to Alexander Graham Bell, and both laboratories were initially conceived to conduct research into telecommunications.
