= Chichester Bell =

Irish audio engineer and inventor (1848–1924)

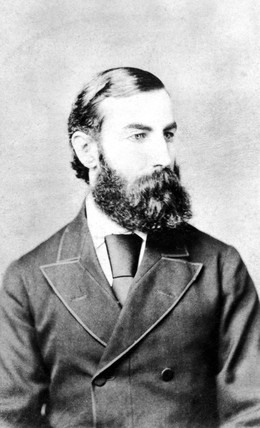
- Born: 1848; Dublin, Ireland
- Died: 11 March 1924 (aged 75–76); Oxford, England
- Education: Trinity College Dublin (B.M., 1869)
- Known for: Invention of the graphophone
- Spouse: Antoinette Ives (m. 1889)
- Parents: David Charles Bell; Ellen Adine Highland
- Relatives: Alexander Melville Bell (uncle); Alexander Graham Bell (cousin)
- Awards: John Scott Medal (1900)
- Engineering career
- Discipline: Audio engineering
- Institutions: Volta Laboratory
- Significant advance: Phonograph A (possible) voice recording of Chichester Bell from 1885

Chichester Alexander Bell (1848 – 11 March 1924) was an Irish audio engineer and inventor. He was a cousin of Alexander Graham Bell and was instrumental in developing the graphophone.

== Life ==
Bell was born in Dublin, Ireland, in 1848 to Professor David Charles Bell (1817–1903) and Ellen Adine Highland. David Charles was an elder brother to Professor Alexander Melville Bell, the renowned British authority on elocution and speech.

Bell received his Baccalaurei in Medicinâ degree in Medicine and Surgery from Trinity College Dublin on 30 June 1869. Prior to moving to Washington, D.C. to join his cousin Alexander Graham Bell's Volta Laboratory, Chichester was assistant professor of chemistry, University College London. In 1881 Chichester Bell began working with Alexander and their associate Charles Tainter on addressing the drawbacks to Thomas Edison's phonograph.

The three men created the Volta Laboratory Association to be the holder of their patents. Their successful development of the graphophone led to the formation of the Volta Graphophone Company of Alexandria, Virginia in February 1886 by the principals, along with Chichester's brother, lawyer and banker, Charles B. Bell (born 1858). While living in Washington, D.C., Chichester Bell was one of the founding members of the Chemical Society Washington Chapter.

He then returned to University College, London to continue his scientific research. In 1887, he published "Sympathetic Vibration of Jets" in the Philosophical Transactions of the Royal Society. Chichester Bell also helped establish the Edison Bell company. The Edison Bell company was established on 30 November 1892 in London to sell phonographs produced by the Edison United Phonograph Company.

Bell was awarded the John Scott Medal of the Franklin Institute in 1900. He married Antoinette Ives in 1889, in Montreal, Quebec, Canada and died at Radcliffe Infirmary, St Giles, Oxford, Oxfordshire, England, on 11 March 1924.

== Patents ==
- U.S. patent 336,081 Transmitter for Electric Telephone Lines, filed May 1884, issued February 1886
- U.S. patent 336,082 Jet Microphone or Apparatus for Transmitting Sounds by Means of Jets, filed May 1884, issued February 1886
- U.S. patent 336,083 Telephone Transmitter, Filed April 1885, issued February 1886
- U.S. patent 341,212 Reproducing Sounds from Phonograph Records (without using a stylus or causing wear), filed November 1885, issued May 1886 (with Alexander Bell and Charles Tainter)
- U.S. patent 341,213 Transmitting And Recording Sounds By Radiant Energy, filed November 1885, issued May 1886 (with Alexander Bell and Charles Tainter)
- U.S. patent 341,214 Recording and Reproducing Speech and Other Sounds (improvements include compliant cutting head, wax surface, and constant linear velocity disk), filed June 1885, issued May 1886 (with Charles Tainter)

== See also ==
- Volta Laboratory and Bureau
