= Alexander Graham Bell Association for the Deaf and Hard of Hearing =

U.S. non-profit organization

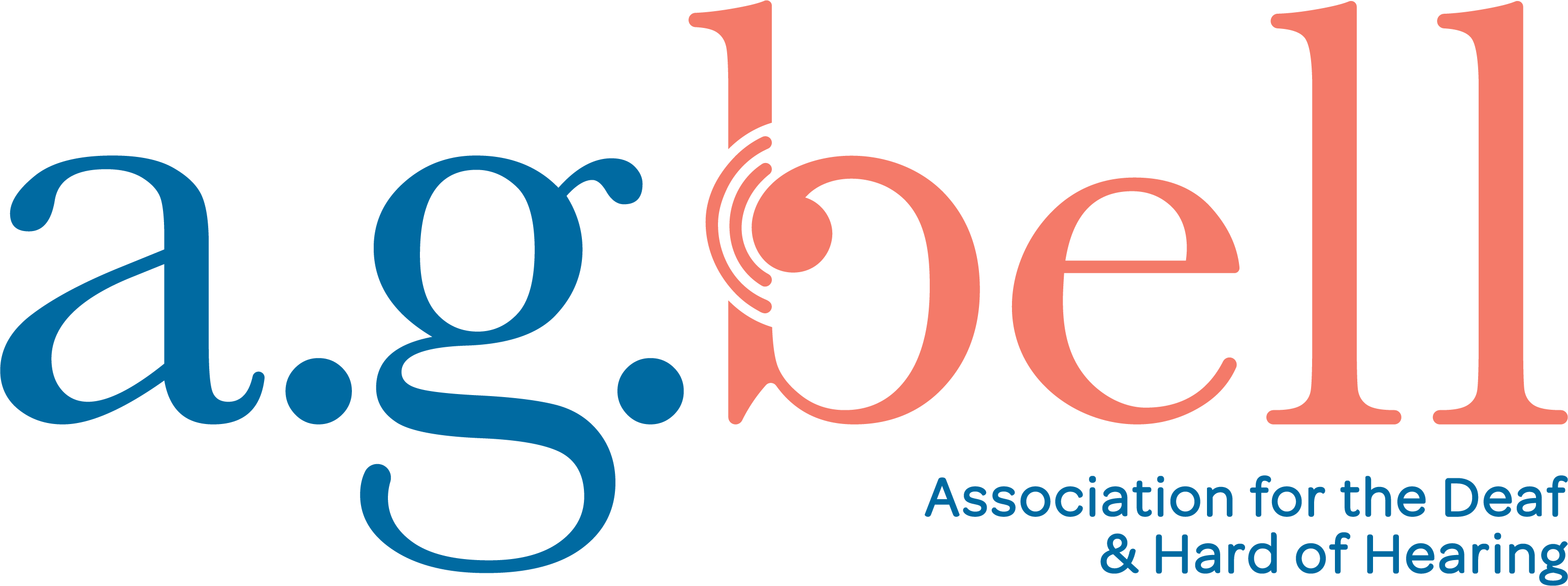

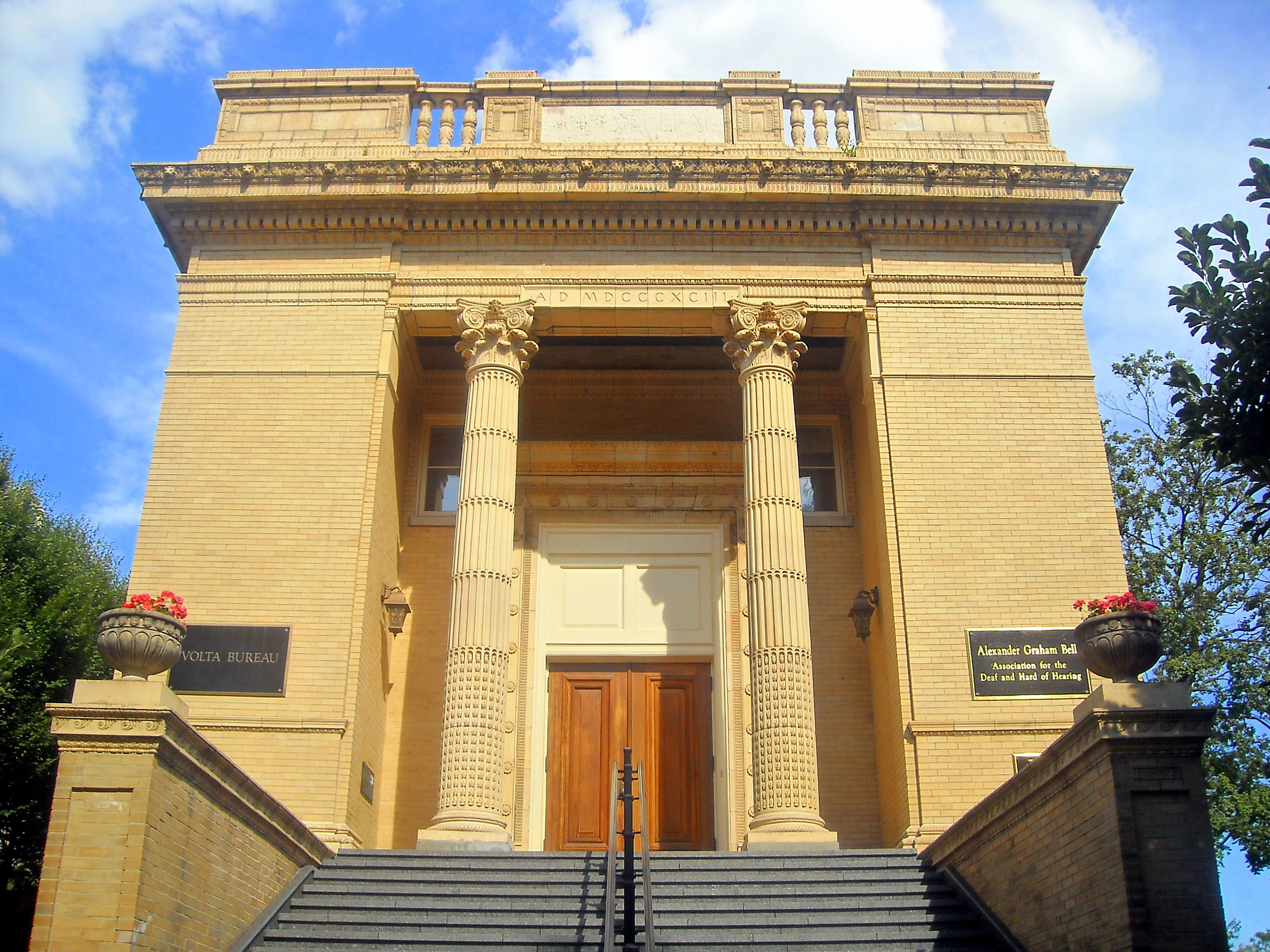
- Headquarters in Washington, DC
- Founded: 1890
- Founder: Alexander Graham Bell
- Purpose: Speech, cochlear implants
- Headquarters: Washington, D.C.
- Location: Washington, D.C., United States
- Region served: United States
- Method: Resources and advocacy
- Key people: Susan Lenihan, Ph.D., Chair; Emilio Alonso-Mendoza, CEO
- Employees: 8
- Website: www.agbell.org

The Alexander Graham Bell Association for the Deaf and Hard of Hearing, also known as AG Bell, is an organization that aims to promote listening and spoken language among people who are deaf and hard of hearing. It is headquartered in Washington, D.C., with chapters located throughout the United States and a network of international affiliates.

== History ==
The Association was originally created as the American Association to Promote the Teaching of Speech to the Deaf (AAPTSD). In 1908 it merged with Alexander Graham Bell's Volta Bureau (founded in 1887 "for the increase and diffusion of knowledge relating to the deaf"), and was renamed as the Alexander Graham Bell Association for the Deaf in 1956 at the suggestion of Mrs. Frances Toms, the mother of a deaf son who was able to achieve high academic standings in mainstream schools with the organization's help. In 1999 the Association was finally renamed to the Alexander Graham Bell Association for the Deaf and Hard of Hearing.

== Controversy ==
The foundation has been criticised for misleading and inaccurate claims made in relation to the use of American Sign Language among the Deaf community after Nyle DiMarco was announced as the winner of season 22 of America's Next Top Model. The Registry of Interpreters for the Deaf, the National Association of the Deaf, the National Black Deaf Advocates and academics accused the foundation of inaccuracy, bias, pseudoscience, xenophobia and eugenics. These are also allegations against Bell himself, who in 1884 published Memoir upon the formation of a deaf variety of the human race, a eugenics text that attributed sign education to more frequent marriages between deaf people, an outcome Bell recommended against on the grounds that family medical history can be one of several contributing factors towards some kinds of hearing loss.
