= Alexander Melville Bell =

British linguist (1819–1905)

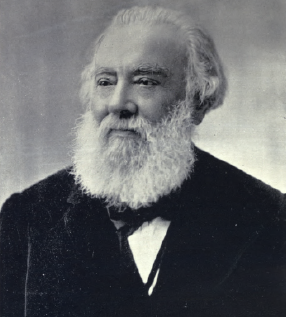
- Born: 1 March 1819; Edinburgh, Scotland
- Died: 7 August 1905 (aged 86); Washington D.C., U.S.
- Resting place: Rock Creek Cemetery; Washington, D.C., U.S.
- Education: University of Edinburgh
- Occupations: Teacher; lecturer; scholar
- Employer: various universities
- Spouses: Eliza Symonds (m. 1844): Harriet G. Shibley
- Children: Melville James Bell (1845–70); Alexander Graham Bell (1847–1922); Edward Charles Bell (1848–67)
- Parent(s): Alexander Bell (1790–1865); Elizabeth Colville (d. 1856)
- Bell's voice Re-identified in 2011, Bell made this graphophone recording of his voice in 1881.

Alexander Melville Bell (1 March 1819 – 7 August 1905) was a teacher and researcher of physiological phonetics and was the author of numerous works on orthoepy and elocution.

Additionally he was also the creator of Visible Speech which was used to help the deaf learn to talk, and was the father of Alexander Graham Bell.

== Biography ==
Alexander Melville Bell was born in Edinburgh, Scotland, and studied under and became the principal assistant of his father, Alexander Bell (b. 3 March 1790, Fife, Scotland d. 23 April 1865, St. Pancras, North London), an authority on phonetics and speech disorders. From 1843 to 1865 he lectured on speech elocution at the University of Edinburgh, and from 1865 to 1870 at the University of London. Melville married Eliza Grace Symonds (b. 21 September 1809, Alverstock, Hampshire d. Georgetown, Washington, D.C., US 5 January 1897), the only daughter of a British naval surgeon.

In 1868, and again in 1870 and 1871, Melville lectured at the Lowell Institute in Boston, Massachusetts, US after having moved to Canada. In 1870 he became a lecturer on philology at Queen's College, Kingston, Ontario; and in 1881 he moved to Washington, D.C. at the suggestion of his son Graham, where he devoted himself to the education of the deaf by the use of Visible Speech in which the alphabetical characters of his linguistic invention were representative graphic diagrams for the various positions and motions of the lips, tongue, mouth, etc., as well as other methods of orthoepy.

Prior to departing Scotland for Canada Melville Bell had published at least 17 works on proper speech, vocal physiology, stenography and other works. Besides instructing at Queen's College he also lectured in Boston, Montreal, Toronto, London, and other universities including a series of 12 lectures at Boston's Lowell Institute. When the Duke and Duchess of Cornwall (later King George V and Queen Mary) called on Brantford for a visit, Melville was asked to greet the dignitaries at the public event. He became a Fellow of the Educational Institute of Scotland, the Royal Scottish Society of Arts, and the American Association for the Advancement of Science, as well as obtaining memberships in other societies.

Alexander Melville Bell was married twice, first to Eliza Grace Symonds in 1844 with whom he had three children, and then to Harriet G. Shibley.

== Visible Speech ==
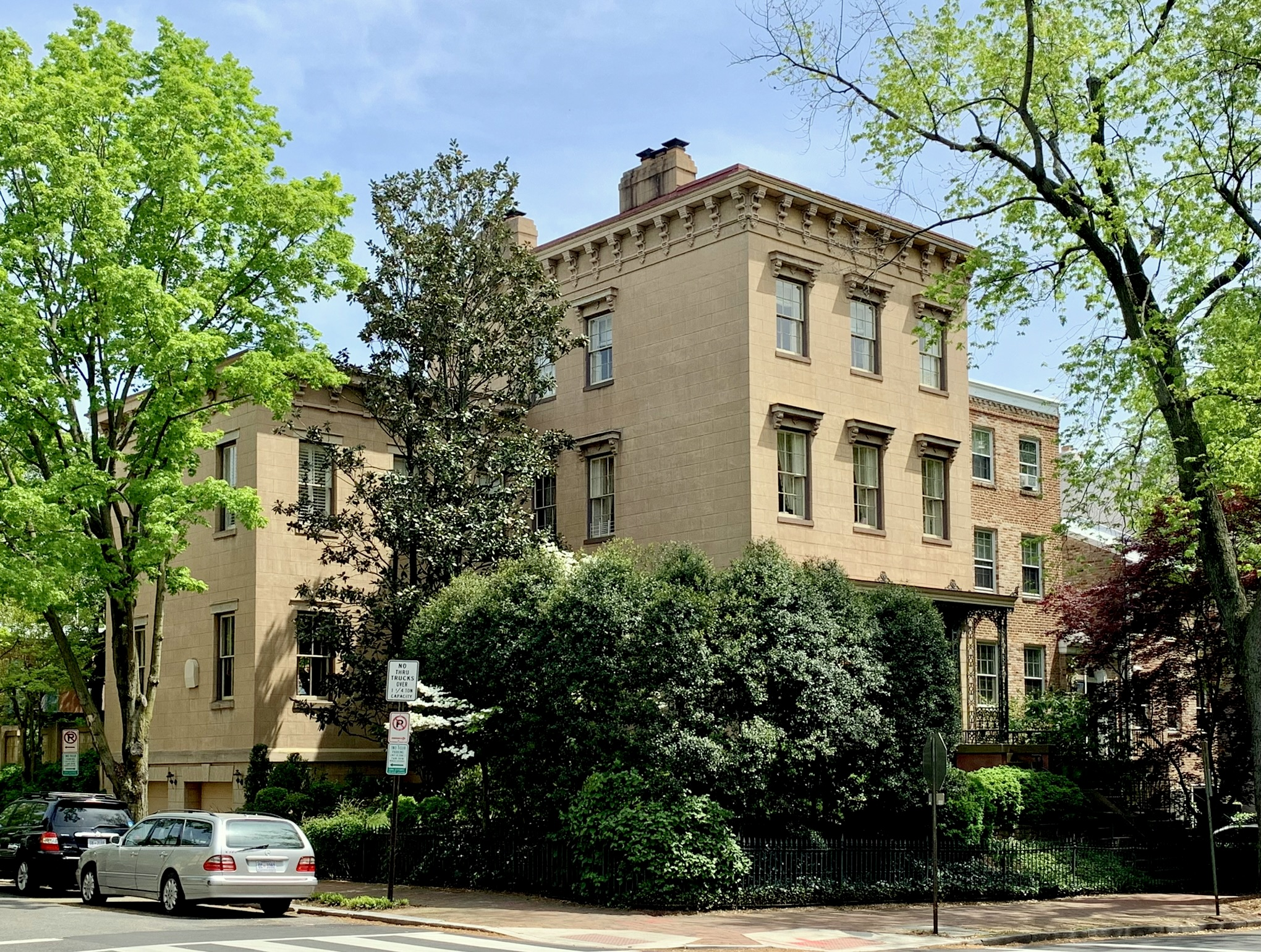
Bell lived in this house in Washington, D.C., from 1881 until his death in 1905.

In 1864 Melville published his first works on Visible Speech, to help the deaf both learn and improve upon their aural speech (since the profoundly deaf could themselves not hear their own aural pronunciations). To promote the language, Bell created two written short forms using his system of 29 modifiers and tones, 52 consonants, 36 vowels and a dozen diphthongs: World English, which was similar to the International Phonetic Alphabet, and also Line Writing, used as a shorthand form for stenographers.

Melville's works on Visible Speech became highly notable, and were described by Édouard Séguin as being "...a greater invention than the telephone of his son, Alexander Graham Bell". Melville saw numerous applications for his invention, including its worldwide use as a universal language. However, although heavily promoted at the Second International Congress on Education of the Deaf in Milan, Italy in 1880, after a period of a dozen years or so in which it was applied to the education of the deaf, Visible Speech was found to be more cumbersome, and thus a hindrance, to the teaching of speech to the deaf compared to other methods, and eventually faded from use.

== Other contributions to the education of the deaf ==
In 1887, his son, Alexander Graham Bell, sold off the intellectual assets owned by the Volta Laboratory Association. Graham used the considerable profits from the sale of his shares to found the Volta Bureau as an instrument "for the increase and diffusion of knowledge relating to the deaf". Graham's scientific and statistical research work on deafness became so large that within the period of a few years his documentation engulfed an entire room of the Volta Laboratory in Melville's backyard carriage house. Due to the limited space available at the carriage house, and with the assistance of Melville who contributed US$15,000 (approximately $540,000 in today's dollars), Graham had his new Volta Bureau building constructed close by in 1893.

== Death and tributes ==
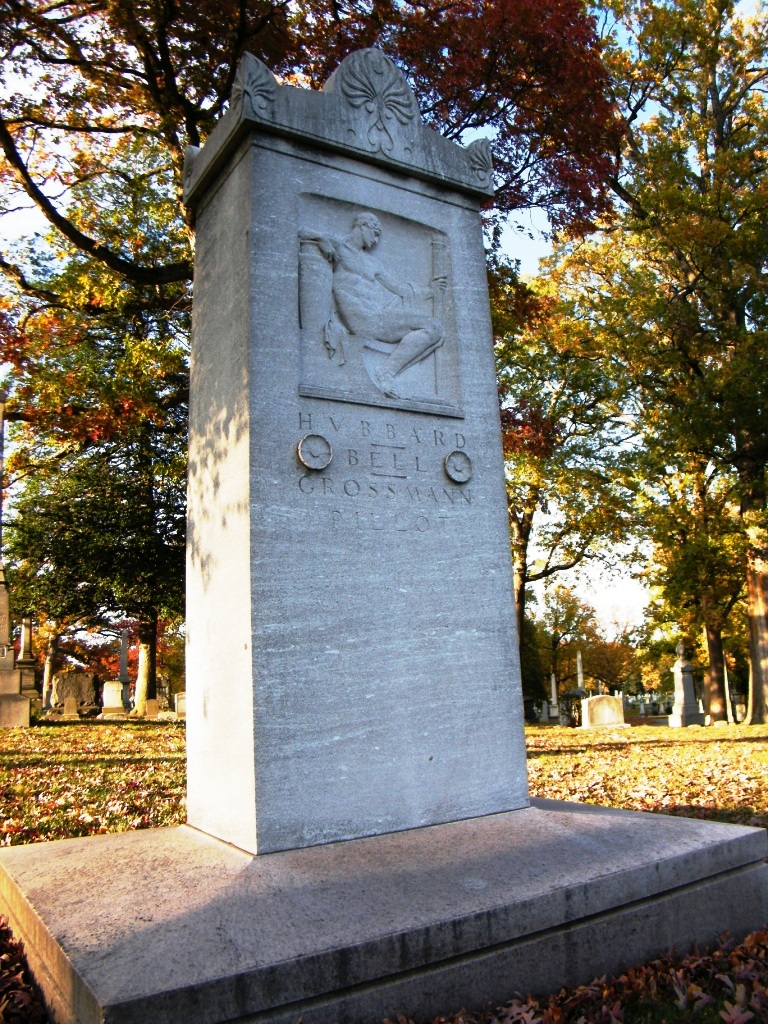
Hubbard Bell Grossman Pillot Memorial

Melville Bell died at age 86 in 1905 due to pneumonia after an operation for diabetes, and was interred in Washington, D.C.'s Rock Creek Cemetery adjacent to the Hubbard • Bell • Grossman • Pillot Memorial, alongside his wife and other members of the Bell and Grosvenor families.

The Bell House at Colonial Beach, Virginia was listed on the National Register of Historic Places in 1987.

The voice of Bell, reciting a sentence from Hamlet, can be heard at the Smithsonian Institution, as extracted from an 1881 graphophone recording.

== Publications ==
The following are some of the more prominent of the 93 publications authored or co-authored by Melville Bell:

- Steno-Phonography (1852)
- Letters and Sounds (1858)
- The Standard Elocutionist (1860, and nearly 200 other editions), including a viewable 1878 edition (below) published by William Mullan & Son, properly cited as:
  - David Charles Bell, Alexander Melville Bell. Bell's Standard Elocutionist: Principles And Exercises, W. Mullan, London, 1878.
- Principles of Speech and Dictionary of Sounds (1863)
- Visible Speech: The Science of Universal Alphabetics (1867)
- Sounds and their Relations (1881)
- Lectures on Phonetics (1885)
- A Popular Manual of Visible Speech and Vocal Physiology (1889)
- World English: the Universal Language (1888)
- The Science of Speech (1897)
- The Fundamentals of Elocution (1899)

== Sources ==
- Bruce, Robert V. Bell: Alexander Bell and the Conquest of Solitude. Ithaca, New York: Cornell University Press, 1990. ISBN 0-8014-9691-8.
- Alexander Graham Bell, Encyclopædia Britannica, 2010. Retrieved 24 May 2010.
- Winzer, Margret A. The History Of Special Education: From Isolation To Integration, Gallaudet University Press, 1993, ISBN 1-56368-018-1, ISBN 978-1-56368-018-2.
