= Florence Calvert Thorne =

American labour activist

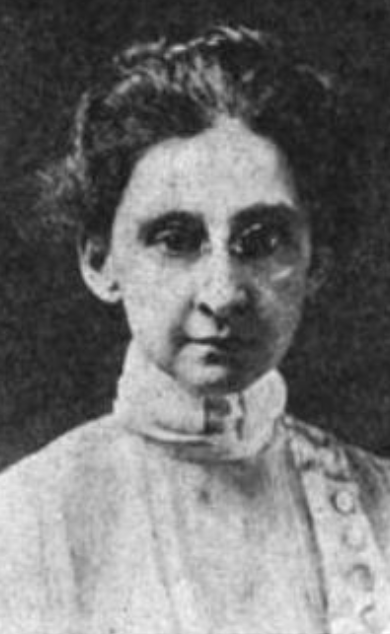
- Florence Calvert Thorne (1918)
- Born: July 28, 1877; Hannibal, Missouri, US
- Died: March 16, 1973 (aged 95); Fairfax, Virginia, US
- Burial place: Rock Creek Cemetery

Florence Calvert Thorne (July 28, 1877 – March 16, 1973) was an American labour activist and long-time member of the American Federation of Labor, where she established vital statistics reporting that would go on to inform New Deal social programs.

== Early life and education ==
Thorne was born July 28, 1877, in Hannibal, Missouri. She graduated from high school as valedictorian of her class in 1896. Thorne studied English and classical languages in at Oberlin College, graduating in 1899. She taught for a year in Georgia before continuing her studies at the University of Chicago, where she received a PhD in 1909. Thorne attended classes at the school during the summer and taught as a means of supporting herself financially in Hannibal during the school year.

== Career ==
Thorne's relationship with the American Federation of Labor began during her doctoral studies, when she contacted the organization while writing a thesis titled "American Federation of Labor in Politics". In 1912 AFL President Samuel Gompers, who had been impressed with her graduate research, offered Thorne a job editing The American Federationist. She would go on to become a primary contributor to the publication, as well as a close colleague and confidante of Gompers.

A supporter of the United States' involvement in World War I, Thorne left her role with AFL in 1917 to take a position on the Advisory Committee of the Council of National Defense's Subcommittee on Women in Industry. A year later she joined the Department of Labor as assistant director of the working conditions service which, at the time, was tasked with establishing and maintaining labor standards in war related industries. After the end of the war, Thorne returned to the AFL, significantly contributing to Gompers' autobiography, Seventy Years of Life and Labor: An Autobiography, conducting much of the research and authoring the Appendix regarding the last months of his life. She was at his bedside when he died in 1924.

Under the tenure of AFL president William Green, Thorne edited the AFL newsletter for several years before being named the director of the organization's newly established research department in 1933. She remained in the role until her retirement from the AFL. The research department was founded based on Thorne's management of volunteer data collection, which included the tracking of unemployment reporting by local unions. Part of her work as head of the research department involved assessing and providing vital statistics information to union heads in order to assist with collective bargaining. During her time with the research department, Thorne researched and conducted studies on topics including affordable housing, compensation, health and medical care, and child labor.

The type of reporting Thorne established went on inform New Deal programs, despite Thorne, like Gompers, being opposed to government legislation in favour of improvements gained through the activism of trade-union organizers. She retired from the American Federation of Labor in 1953.

== Later life ==
=== Calvert Estate ===
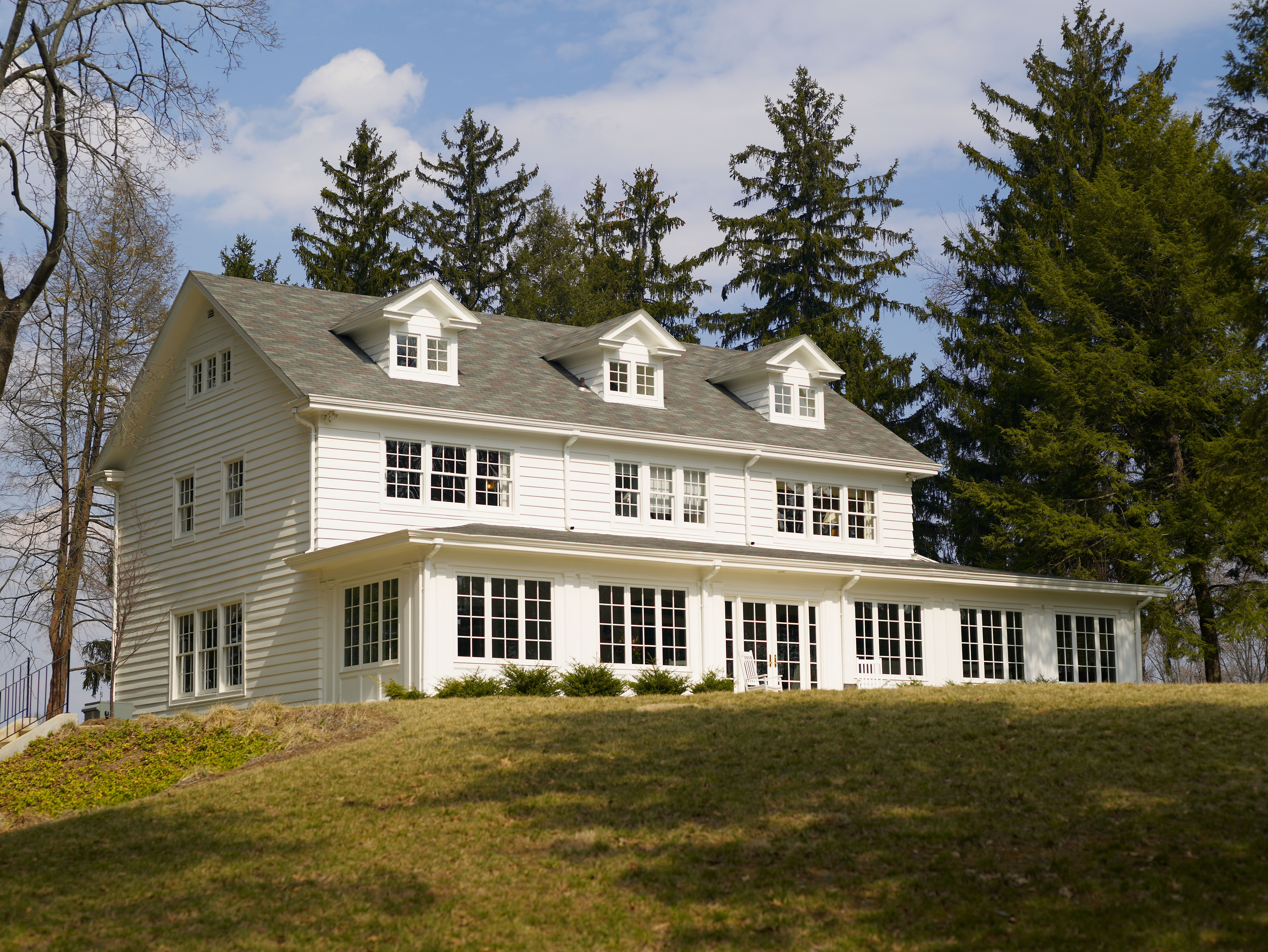
Home of Thorne and Scattergood

Thorne spent her later life in Virginia, where she bought a Virginia estate with life-long partner Margaret Scattergood. Built in 1926, the four story Georgian Revival house is located at 6200 Georgetown Pike. The couple named the house Calvert House, later known as the Calvert Estate. Within a decade of purchasing the property, it became of interest to United States Government because the Central Intelligence Agency headquarters in Langley, Virginia was expanding and beginning to encroach on the land. Thorne and Scattergood agreed to sell the land to the government provided they were allowed to live out the rest of their lives in the home. The CIA took over the estate following Scattergood's death in 1986. The building was used to house the CIA's K9 unit for several years before falling into disrepair. It was renovated in the early 2000s, after which time it began operating as the Scattergood-Thorne Conference Center.

=== Death ===
Thorne died on March 16, 1973, at the age of 95 in Fairfax, Virginia. She was buried at Rock Creek Cemetery in Washington, D.C.
