= Ethel M. Smith =

American activist (1877–1951)

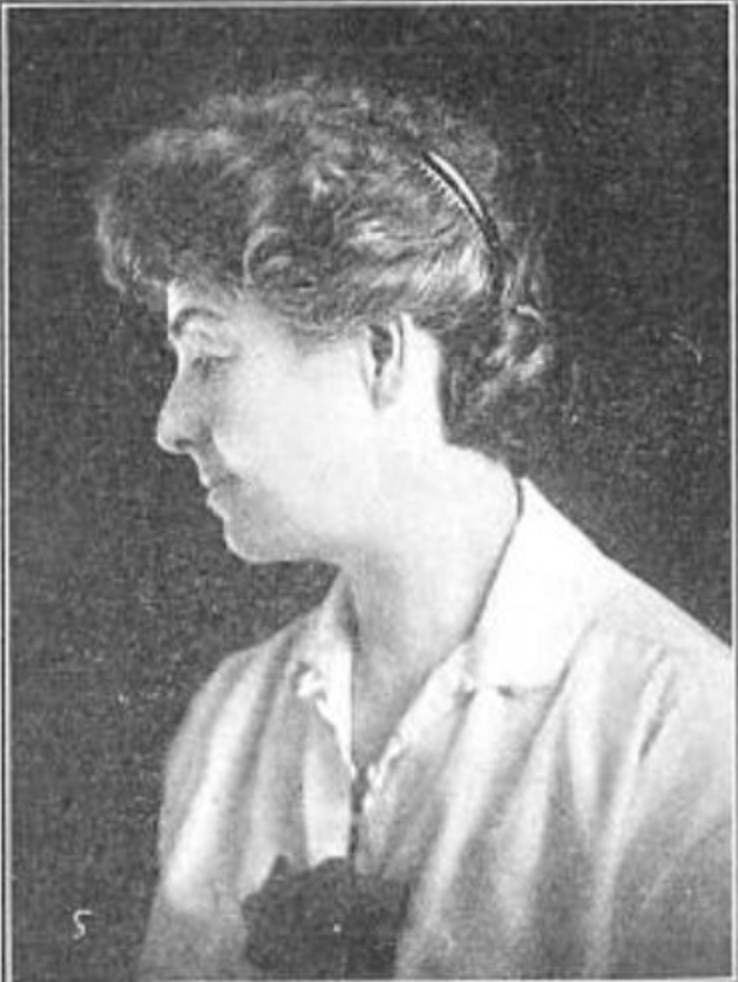
- Smith in 1917
- Born: Ethel Marion Smith; November 1, 1877; Sangamon County, Illinois, U.S.
- Died: March 24, 1951 (aged 73); Washington, D.C., U.S.
- Resting place: Rock Creek Cemetery
- Occupations: Editor, civil servant, organizer, lobbyist
- Known for: Women's rights and labor activist
- Relatives: Florence Patteson Smith (sister)

Ethel Marion Smith (November 1, 1877 – March 23, 1951) was an American women’s rights activist and a union activist in the early 1920s. She participated in women’s organizations such as the National American Woman Suffrage Association (NAWSA) and the Women's Trade Union League (WTUL). She also worked with other union organizations such as the National Federation of Federal Employees (NFFE) and the American Federation of Labor (AFL).

== Early life and education ==
Smith was born in Sangamon County, Illinois, the daughter of Richard Peter Smith and Marion Elizabeth Patterson. Smith’s father, Richard Smith, was a wage worker; his work ranged from farmer to teacher to deputy sheriff. In 1895 Ethel Smith graduated from high school and went to work as a stenographer.

== Career ==
In 1897 Smith went to Chicago to take a test in order to qualify her to become a stenographer at the Census Office. In 1901 she was transferred to the Bureau of Fisheries to work as a clerk and as a stenographer making $720 a year. After a few months Smith was promoted by the Civil Service Commission to be the private secretary to the Chief of the Division of Scientific Inquiry with a pay increase to $1000 a year, making Ethel Smith one of the highest paid women in civil service. During the summer of 1901 and the two summers following, Smith assisted the director of Scientific Inquiry as he worked in Woods Hole, Massachusetts as director of Commissions Laboratory. Smith also worked as a librarian for residence research workers during this time.

In 1904 Ethel Smith assisted the editor of the Civil Service Commission publications in Washington D.C.; she was editor there from 1906 till 1914. By 1912 Smith had been passed over for promotion several times and received no increase in pay. Although she was earning $1600 a year it was still less than her predecessors. When she brought the issue up to her superiors she was told that they had no intention of promoting her or increasing her pay because of the belief that as a woman she could not be the primary bread winner. In 1912 Ethel Smith began to do volunteer work for the suffrage movement in the evenings.

== Activism ==
=== Suffrage ===
In 1914, Smith resigned from her position as editor of the Civil Service Commission publications and took a paid position as secretary for the Congressional Committee of the National American Woman Suffrage Association (NAWSA). Smith was appointed to her position after Alice Paul left NAWSA to start the National Woman's Party (NWP) leaving the position of chairwoman of the Congressional Committee open to Ruth McCormick who then appointed Ethel Smith as Secretary.

Smith worked as a state organizer for the Committee as well as tracked suffrage votes and reported the activities of other suffrage organizations. Then in April 1917, Smith was appointed as Director of NAWSA's Industrial Committee and their Publicity Bureau. Within the Industrial Committee Smith worked to safeguard the industrial standards during World War I and organized a “systematic propaganda campaign against excessive overtime and underpay in industries where women are employed.” Smith pushed the suffrage movement to extend their organizational experiences and interests to include other areas that were in need of legislative change, such as women’s labor. She called for reforms saying that work performed rather than gender should determine the wage. NAWSA disagreed, however. The president, Carrie Catt, wrote Smith that although they supported Smith they were worried she had lost sight of the goal to obtain the Nineteenth Amendment to the United States Constitution, and it was best to focus their primary efforts on that issue. She sought “to join forces with labor unions and organizations that promoted collective action to educate and unite working men and women.”

=== Labor organizing and minimum wage laws ===
In November 1917, Smith became active in the National Federation of Federal Employees which engaged in a range of actives to establish modern standards of wage and working conditions in the civil services. Smith became a member of their Legislative Committee to further education on social and economic welfare for Federal employees.

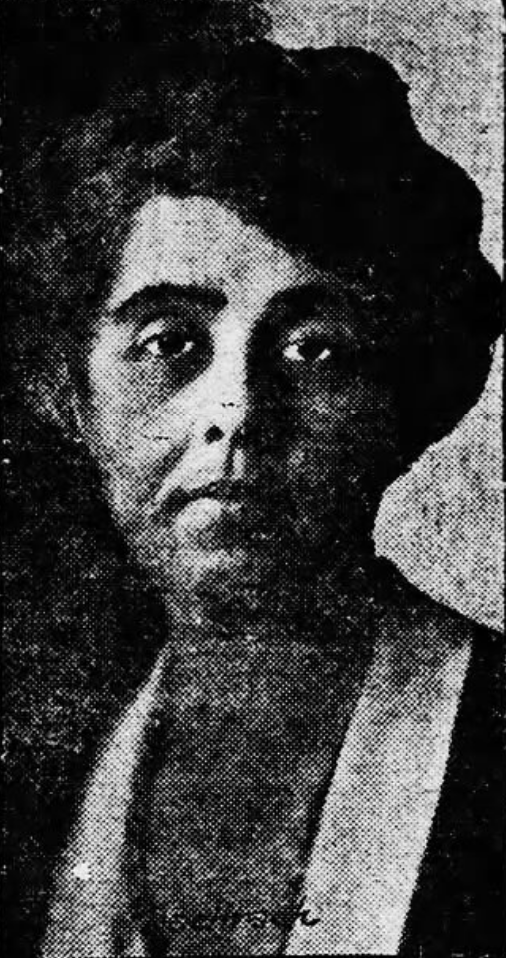
Ethel M. Smith, from a 1921 newspaper

In 1918, Ethel Smith was elected Executive Secretary of the Women's Trade Union League's Washington Committee and the Resident Secretary for its National Legislative Committee. While on the Legislative Committee she was recognized as an effective lobbyist for minimum wage laws, the creation of the Women’s Bureau in the Department of Labor, and the eight-hour work day. The Washington Committee allowed her to educate working women on the power of unions and to create several unions between 1918 and 1920, including unions for women cigar makers and for employees of the Bureau of Engraving and Printing. Also in 1918, The Central Labor Union of Washington, D.C. selected her to serve as a labor representative on the local minimum wage board which was crucial to creating the Kesting-Tramell Minimum Wage Law.

In the 1920s she joined the Women’s Bureau. The Women’s Bureau worked to “formulate standards and policies which shall promote the welfare of wage earning women… and advance their opportunities for profitable employment.” Smith worked closely with the Women’s Bureau in the campaign to enforce the merit system and pay equality for women in the federal civil service. For the next few years Ethel Smith worked for the passing of a minimum wage law for women and children in Washington, D.C. and the Child Labor Amendment.

== Publications ==
- "Working Women's Case against 'Equal Rights'" (1924, The New York Times)
- "Women Working for New Laws" (1925, The New York Times)
- "The Women's Industrial Conference" (1926, The Woman Citizen)
- "Woman Worker Fights for Higher Standards" (1926, The New York Times)
- "Federated Women Number 3,000,000" (1926, The New York Times)
- "Equality Divides Women's Congress" (1926, The New York Times)
- "Women Take Note of New Problems" (1926, The New York Times)
- "America's Domestic Servant Shortage" (1927, Current History)
- "Equal Opportunity for Women Wage Earners" (1929, Current History)

== Personal life ==
Smith's hard work took its toll on her health, and in late 1920 Ethel Smith collapsed due to extreme exhaustion. Smith spent the next several months recuperating. Ethel Smith died in 1951, at the age of 73, at her home in Washington, D.C. She was buried in Rock Creek Cemetery.
