= Robert King Stone =

American physician (1822–1872)

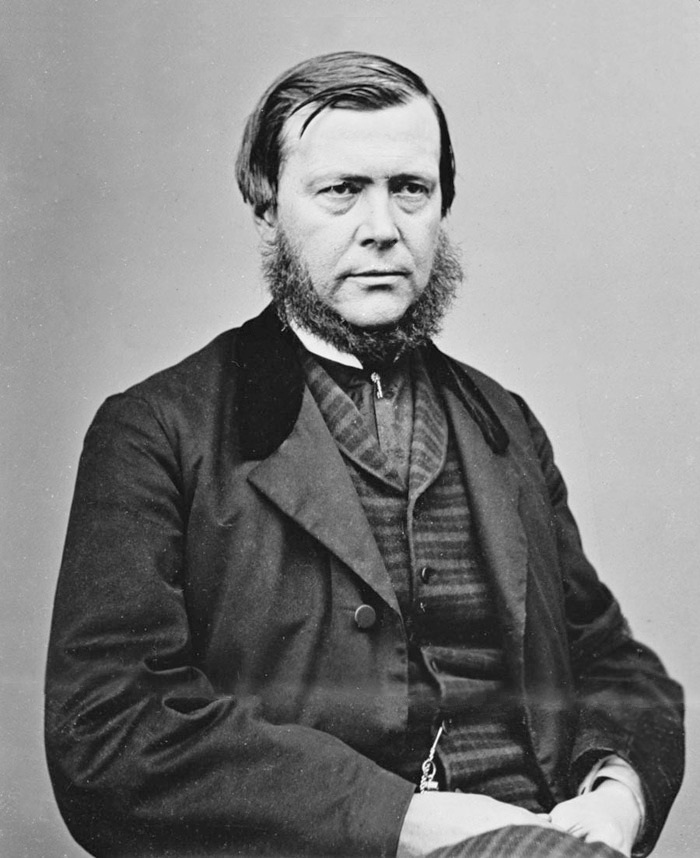
Robert King Stone

Robert King Stone (December 11, 1822 – April 23, 1872) was an American physician and professor at Columbian College Medical School, the predecessor to George Washington University School of Medicine. He was considered "the dean of the Washington, D.C. medical community".

Stone served U.S. President Abraham Lincoln during the years of the American Civil War, frequently treating maladies from the Lincoln family. Stone was present at Lincoln's deathbed and at his autopsy in 1865. Stone was one of 14 doctors to attend President Lincoln at his death bed. Stone was the only witness to his condition at the military tribunal, and his testimony has been shared by the National Archive of the United States.

== Early life and education ==
Stone was born December 11, 1822, in Washington, D.C., the son of engraver William J. Stone and his wife Elizabeth Jane Lenthall. Lenthall was the daughter of John Lenthall one of the architects of the United States Capitol.

He received his medical degree from the University of Pennsylvania in 1845 and visited major hospitals of London, Paris and Vienna before starting his own medical practice in the United States in 1847. Stone specialized in eye problems and was professor of Ophthalmic and Aural Surgery.

== Legacy ==
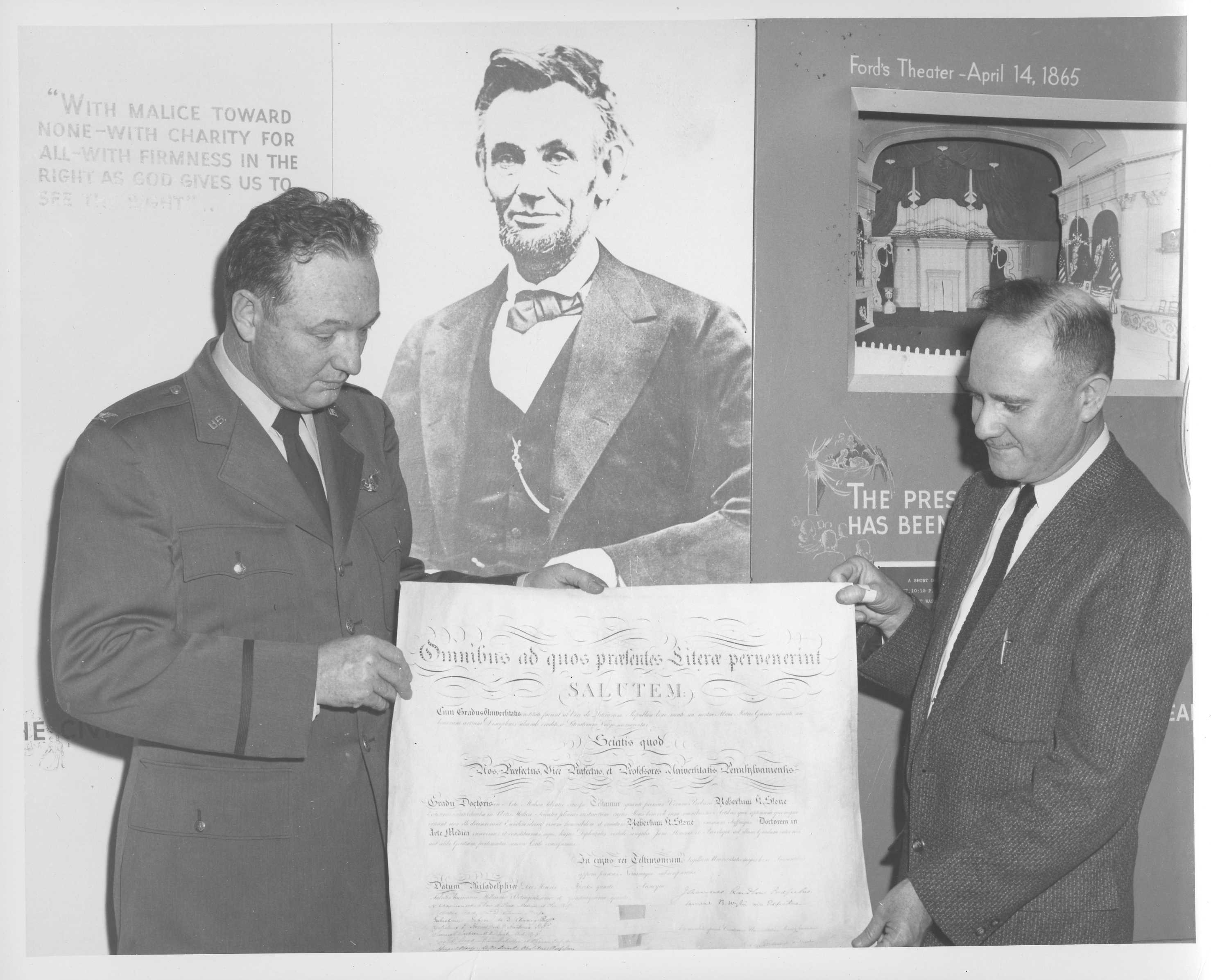
Diploma of Dr. Stone, National Museum of Health and Medicine (1950s)

A collection of his papers is held at the National Library of Medicine in Bethesda, Maryland. Stone's "lost" report of the Lincoln autopsy was discovered in 1965 and examined by John K. Lattimer. Some of his notes of the autopsy were displayed at the Fenimore Art Museum in Cooperstown, New York.

== Death ==
At the time of his death, from apoplexy, he was one of the most prominent physicians in Washington, D.C. He was survived by his wife, Elizabeth J. Stone, who died in 1892. He was buried in Rock Creek Cemetery.
