= Florence Patteson Smith =

American labor researcher and analyst (1885–1942)

- Smith, from a 1920 publication
- Born: July 30, 1885; Springfield, Illinois, U.S.
- Died: July 25, 1942 (aged 56); Washington, D.C., U.S.
- Occupations: Librarian, research, analyst
- Relatives: Ethel M. Smith (sister)

Florence Patteson Smith (July 30, 1885 – July 25, 1942) was an American labor researcher and analyst based in the United States Women's Bureau.

== Biography ==
Smith was born in Springfield, Illinois, the daughter of Richard Peter Smith and Marion Elizabeth Patteson Smith. Her father was a school principal and local politician. Her older sister Ethel M. Smith was an activist involved in the women's suffrage and labor movements.

Smith was a librarian in the United States Department of Agriculture. She started working at the United States Women's Bureau in 1920, doing research on working women. She helped unionize federal worker and was a member of the Women's Trade Union League. She was secretary of the Washington Federal Employes' Union.

Smith died in 1942, at the age of 56, in Washington, D.C.

== Publications ==
- "Federal Employes' Union Celebrates Anniversary" (1918)
- "How Federal Employes Have Become Articulate" (1920)
- Facts about Working Women: A Graphic Presentation Based on Census Statistics and Studies of the Women's Bureau (1925)
- Chronological development of labor legislation for women in the United States (1929)
- State Labor Laws for Women (1938)
- State Minimum-Wage Laws and Orders: An Analysis (1939)
