= Kauffmann Memorial =

Artwork by William Ordway Partridge

Coordinates: 38.9487°N 77.0125°W

- Seven Ages of Memory (English)
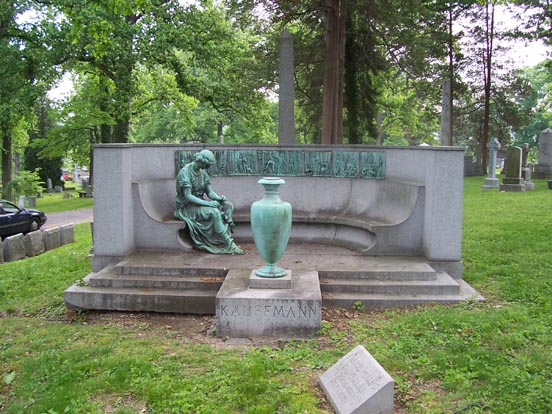
- Artist: William Ordway Partridge
- Year: 1897
- Type: Bronze
- Dimensions: 180 cm × 410 cm × 370 cm (70 in × 163 in × 144 in)
- Location: Washington, D.C.
- Owner: Rock Creek Cemetery

Kauffmann Memorial is a public artwork by American artist William Ordway Partridge, located at Rock Creek Cemetery in Washington, D.C., United States. Kauffmann Memorial was originally surveyed as part of the Smithsonian's Save Outdoor Sculpture! survey in 1993. The memorial is a tribute and grave for Samuel H. Kauffmann, the former owner of the Washington Star and president of the Corcoran Gallery.

== Description ==
The memorial features a curved granite wall exedra with seven bronze relief panels on the curve and a curved bench. Upon the bench, a "classically-draped" figure of a woman sits. She leans forward with her head bowed, looking down at a wreath made of asphodel she is in the process of making. She wears a robe tied at the waist, sandals, and her hair is pulled back and curved around her face. This woman represents "Memory," and the bronze panels (15 in. x 26 in.) depicts scenes from Shakespeare's "Seven Ages of Men," from As You Like It. In front of the bench and wall is a large urn that is placed on a low granite block.

The front of the urn has the inscription: KAUFFMANN

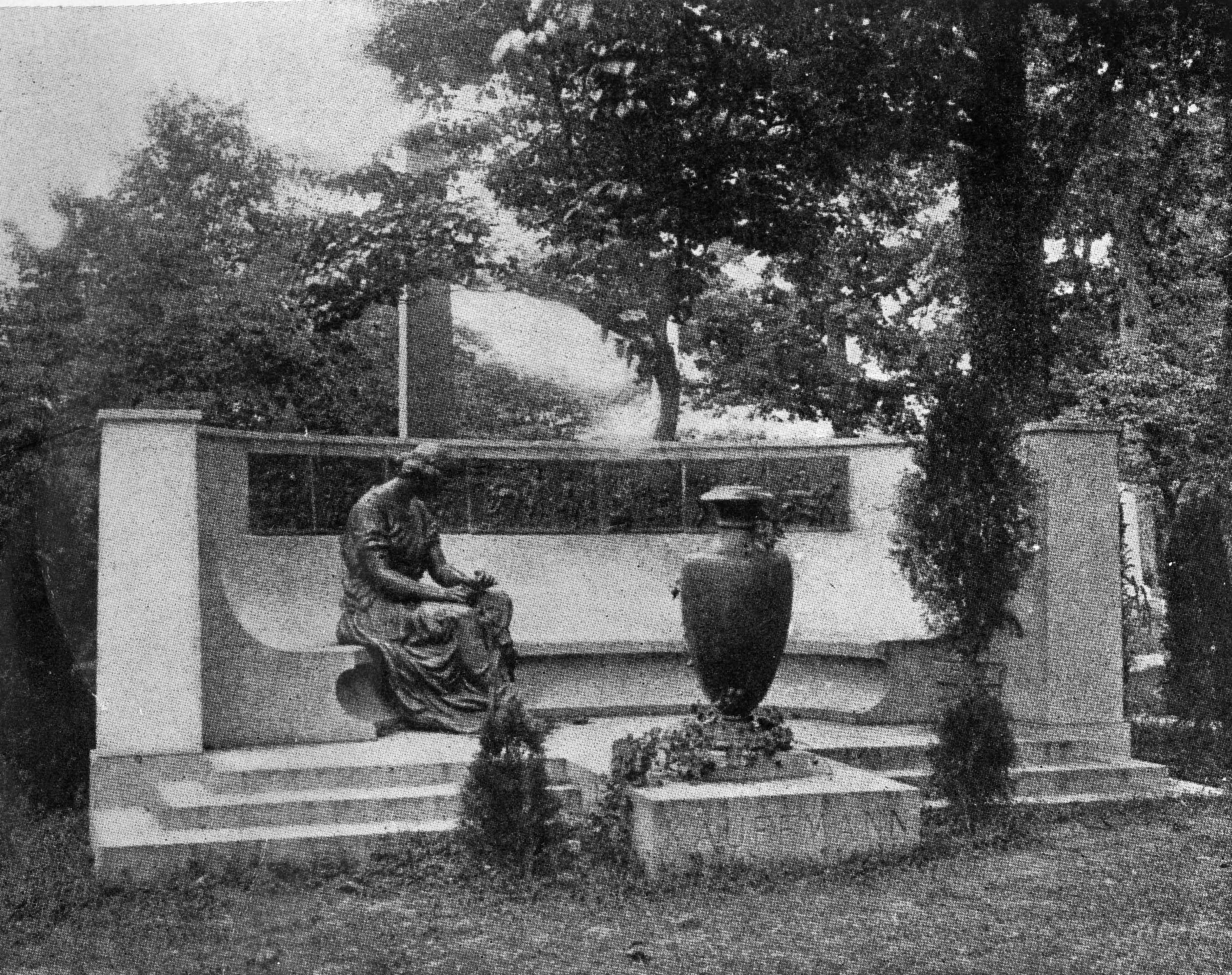
Picture from Partridge's 1914 catalogue

== Condition ==
This sculpture was surveyed in 1994 for its condition and it was described that "treatment needed".
