= Scattergood-Thorne Estate =

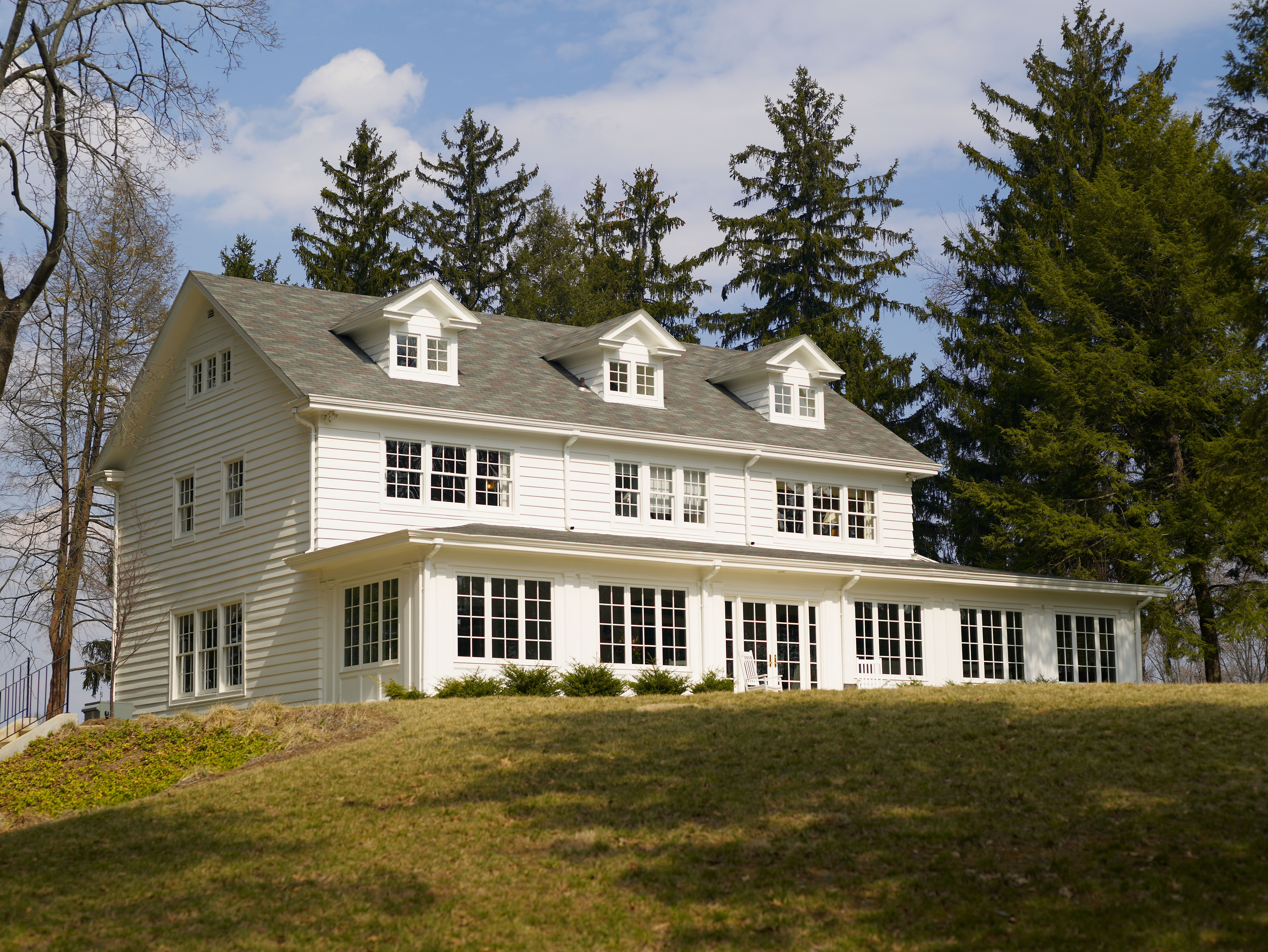
- Interactive map of Scattergood-Thorne Estate

General information
- Architectural style: Georgian Revival
- Location: 6200 Georgetown Pike, Langley, Virginia
- Coordinates: 38.945582°N 77.148735°W
- Named for: Florence Calvert Thorne and Margaret Scattergood
- Year built: 1926
- Renovated: 2003
- Owner: Central Intelligence Agency
- Landlord: George Bush Center for Intelligence

Technical details
- Floor area: 5,000 sq. ft.
- Lifts/elevators: 1
- Grounds: 32 Acres
- Designations: National Register of Historic Places

The Scattergood-Thorne Estate, formerly known as the Calvert Estate and Scattergood Manor, is a historic family home and land on the grounds of the George Bush Center for Intelligence, the headquarters of the Central Intelligence Agency (CIA). Today, it hosts the Scattergood-Thorne Conference Center, used by the CIA for events, and is the oldest structure standing on the CIA campus. It is named after two women life-partner labour unionist strike activists and pioneers at the American Federation of Labor, who lived in the home at the time that the government purchased the property. However, the two women negotiated that they would sell their estate, as long as they were allowed to remain in the home. As such, the CIA developed its headquarters around their home. The home is visible from Virginia Route 123.

== History ==
The estate was once a small portion of a large, 2,800 acre property owned by Thomas Lee in 1719, who named his own estate at the time Langley, Virginia. This property was divided through the years until 1933, when its present 20-acre land was purchased by Florence Calvert Thorne and Margaret Scattergood. At the time, they called it the Calvert Estate, in honor of Sir George Calvert, Thorne's direct ancestor. In 1935, they purchased an additional 12 acres.

Another woman, May Stotts Allen, was also recorded having lived here when the Census taker from the United States Census Bureau came for the 1940 Census, but little is known about her apart from her appearance in this form – initially written down as "white," but with that field scratched-out and replaced with "negro."

In the 1940s, the Federal Highway Administration (FHWA) purchased a property at Georgetown Pike. Scattergood and Thorne, seeing that the Highway Administration was purchasing their neighboring land, (including the Thomas Leiter house and Leiter Estate) secured a contract that would allow the government to purchase their property for $54,189, as long as they agreed to let the two women remain in their home until they died. This contract, known as a living trust, authorized the government to take possession of the home upon their death. At the time, Scattergood and Thorne assumed that the Highway Administration would be the only government agency using the land.

However, in the 1950s, the Central Intelligence Agency had already outgrown its original headquarters at the E Street Complex and was scattered in buildings throughout the DC Beltway area, and Allen Dulles greatly desired a more consolidated and centralized headquarters for his agency. They obtained 225 acres of the Highway Administration property in the late 50's which included the Calvert Estate, and the first CIA employees moved into their headquarters down the road in 1961.

Throughout the latter half of the Cold War, Thorne would use the CIA to her advantage by securing travel visas and passports faster than she would have done as a normal civilian, while Scattergood, a Quaker, continued her political campaign of anti-war pacifism. On one occasion, she even hosted the Sandinista National Liberation Front at her home for a dinner, while the CIA was trying to eliminate them in their home country.

Scattergood wrote to Martin Luther King Jr., encouraging him to keep fighting, she investigated businesses that were not paying their union members a decent living wage, advocated against the segregation of swimming pools in Virginia, and lobbied congress hard to end what she determined were useless wars. She was one of the most prominent and loudest voices in her day against rampant spending for CIA activities.

Meanwhile, the director of central intelligence would occasionally bring the couple a roast turkey, and clandestine officers would greet the women on their way in to work. Thorne died in 1973, and Scattergood died in 1986. Despite the fact that Scattergood and Thorne were politically opposed to the concept of the CIA in general, they were remembered fondly by the officers and agents who knew them.

After the women died, the house and grounds became the K9 Unit training facility. It remained a K9 unit for many years, until it fell into disrepair. In 2003, the home was renovated by CIA employee "Mike M." who turned it into a conference center.

When reporters from CBS News were given a private tour of the house in 2024, they noted that only one room in the house is locked to outside visitors – Room 3.

== See also ==
- Felix Leiter
