= Adams Memorial (Saint-Gaudens) =

- U.S. National Register of Historic Places
- D.C. Inventory of Historic Sites
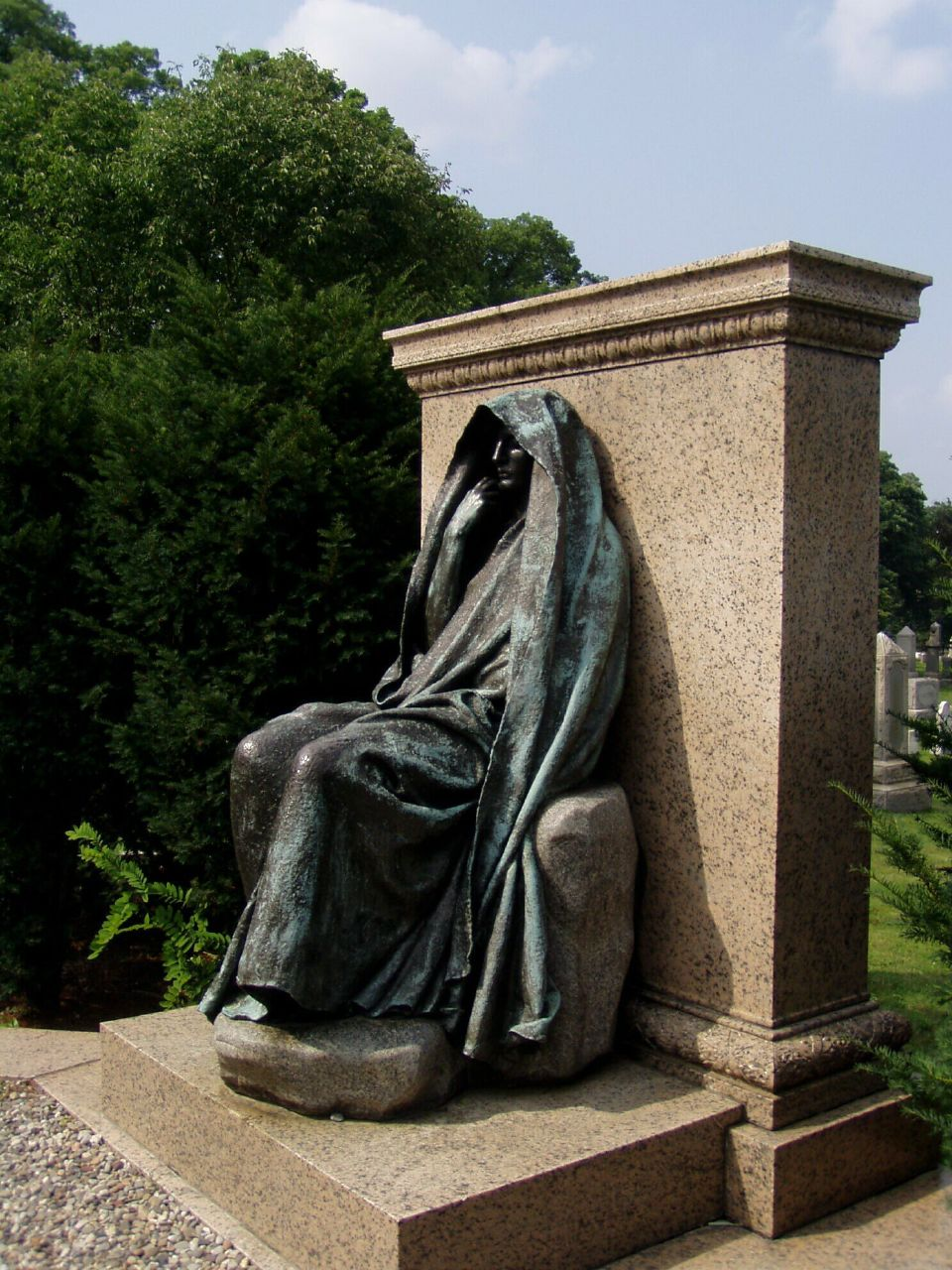
- The Adams Memorial by Augustus Saint-Gaudens and Stanford White (2007)

- Location within District of Columbia
- Location: Rock Creek Cemetery; Webster St. and Rock Creek Church Rd., NW. Washington, D.C.
- Coordinates: 38°56′50.5″N 77°0′37″W
- Built: 1891
- Architect: Augustus Saint-Gaudens; Stanford White
- NRHP reference No.: 72001420

Significant dates
- Added to NRHP: March 16, 1972
- Designated DCIHS: November 8, 1964

The Adams Memorial is a grave marker for Marian Hooper Adams and Henry Adams located in Section E of Rock Creek Cemetery, Washington, D.C. The memorial features a cast bronze allegorical sculpture by Augustus Saint-Gaudens (which he called The Mystery of the Hereafter and The Peace of God that Passeth Understanding, but which was often called in the newspapers "Grief"). Saint-Gaudens' statue of a shrouded figure is seated against a granite block which takes up one side of a hexagonal plaza, designed by architect Stanford White. Across from the statue is a stone bench for visitors. The whole is sheltered by a close screen of dense conifers.

== History ==
Erected in 1891, the monument was commissioned by author/historian Henry Adams (a member of the Adams political family) as a memorial to his wife, Marian "Clover" Hooper Adams. Marian, known as Clover since childhood, was born into an affluent, patrician, liberal Boston family. Suffering from depression, she had killed herself by ingesting potassium cyanide, a chemical used to develop photographs. She was known to be witty, and was a widely traveled photographer and linguist; her translations and research were invaluable to her more celebrated husband, Henry. Adams advised Saint-Gaudens to contemplate iconic images from Buddhist devotional art. One such subject, Kannon (also known as Guan Yin, the Bodhisattva of compassion), is frequently depicted as a seated figure draped in cloth. In particular, a painting of Kannon by Kanō Motonobu, in the collection of the Museum of Fine Arts, Boston, and shown to Saint-Gaudens by John LaFarge, is said to have played a major role in influencing the conception and design of this sculpture. The malachite-green figure sits on a mottled red granite platform, a remarkable exception in a sea of earlier memorials cut from monochromatic stone.

Henry Adams, who traveled to Japan with John LaFarge ostensibly to find inspiration for this memorial, particularly wanted elements of serenely immovable Buddhist human figures to be contrasted with the waterfall-like robe associated with Kannon. They had met while La Farge was engaged in creating the interiors for Boston's Trinity Church (1873–77), a milestone American building by Henry Hobson Richardson, who also designed Adams's Washington home. La Farge expanded Adams's knowledge of Eastern art and philosophy, which was in vogue in elegant circles at that time. In addition to the still and flowing elements, the monument's dualism includes male-female fusion in the figure itself and blends Asian and European ideals of figure. These checks to the standard heroic figure combine to make a "countermonument" for a woman who disliked monuments, generally. Saint-Gaudens may also have been influenced by Parisian funerary art from his stay in France. He appears to have struggled over several years with various sculptural possibilities under the guidance of La Farge, who acted as an intermediary between sculptor and client.

Saint-Gaudens's name for the bronze figure is The Mystery of the Hereafter and The Peace of God that Passeth Understanding, but the public commonly called it Grief – an appellation that Henry Adams apparently disliked. In a letter addressed to Homer Saint-Gaudens, on January 24, 1908, Adams instructed him:

"Do not allow the world to tag my figure with a name! Every magazine writer wants to label it as some American patent medicine for popular consumption – Grief, Despair, Pear's Soap, or Macy's Men's Suits Made to Measure. Your father meant it to ask a question, not to give an answer; and the man who answers will be damned to eternity like the men who answered the Sphinx."

In his The Education ... Henry Adams reflects on the statue and its interpreters: "His first step, on returning to Washington, took him out to the cemetery known as Rock Creek, to see the bronze figure which St. Gaudens had made for him in his absence. ... in all that it had to say, he never once thought of questioning what it meant. He supposed its meaning to be the one commonplace about it – the oldest idea known to human thought. ... As Adams sat there, numbers of people came, for the figure seemed to have become a tourist fashion, and all wanted to know its meaning. ... Like all great artists, St. Gaudens held up the mirror and no more."

At the time of Saint-Gaudens's death, the statue was well known as an important work of American sculpture. Its popularity inspired at least one prominent copy, the Black Aggie, which was sold to General Felix Agnus for his gravesite.

On March 16, 1972, the Adams Memorial was listed on the National Register of Historic Places.

== Gallery ==
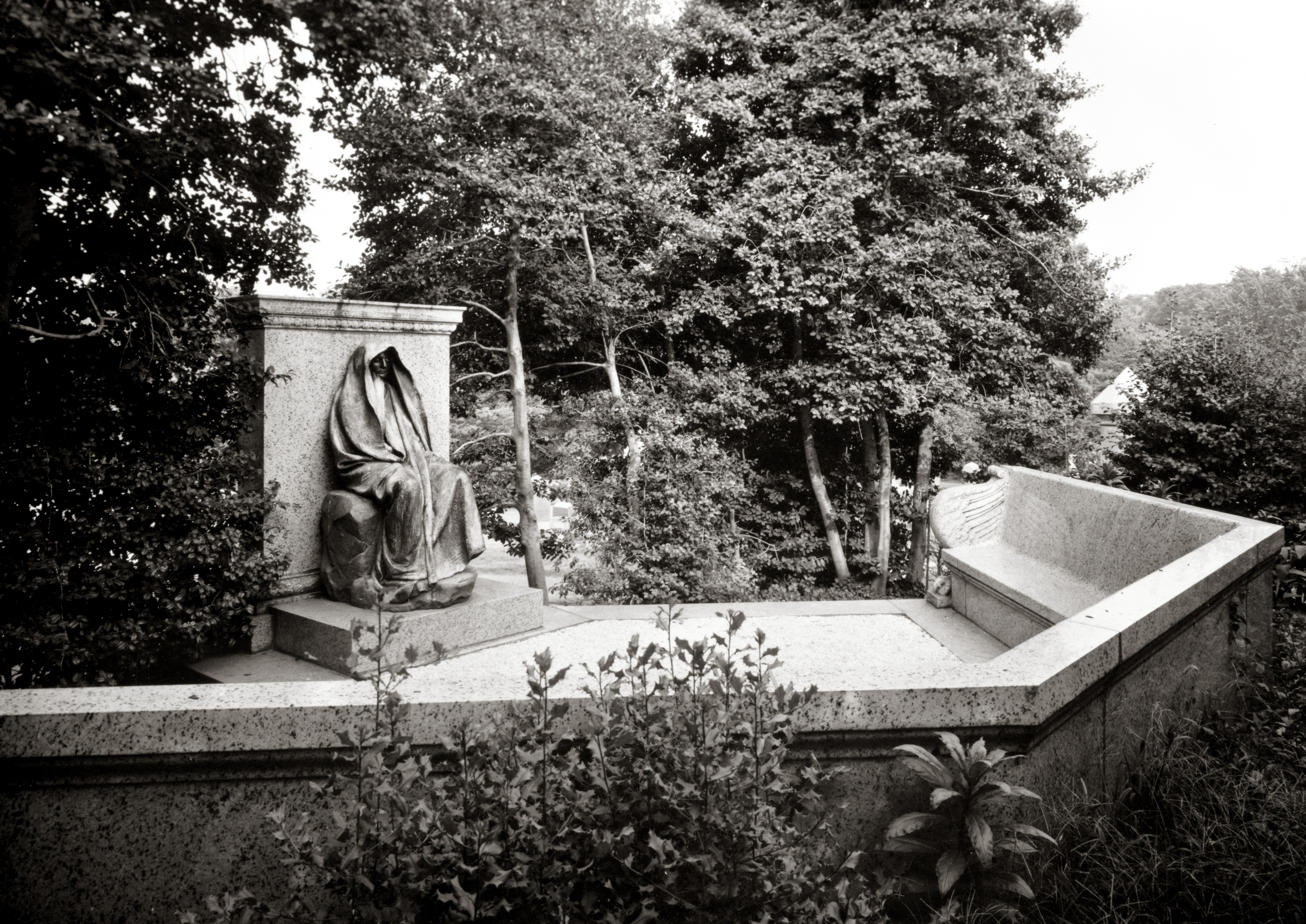
Adams Memorial from the Historic American Buildings Survey.

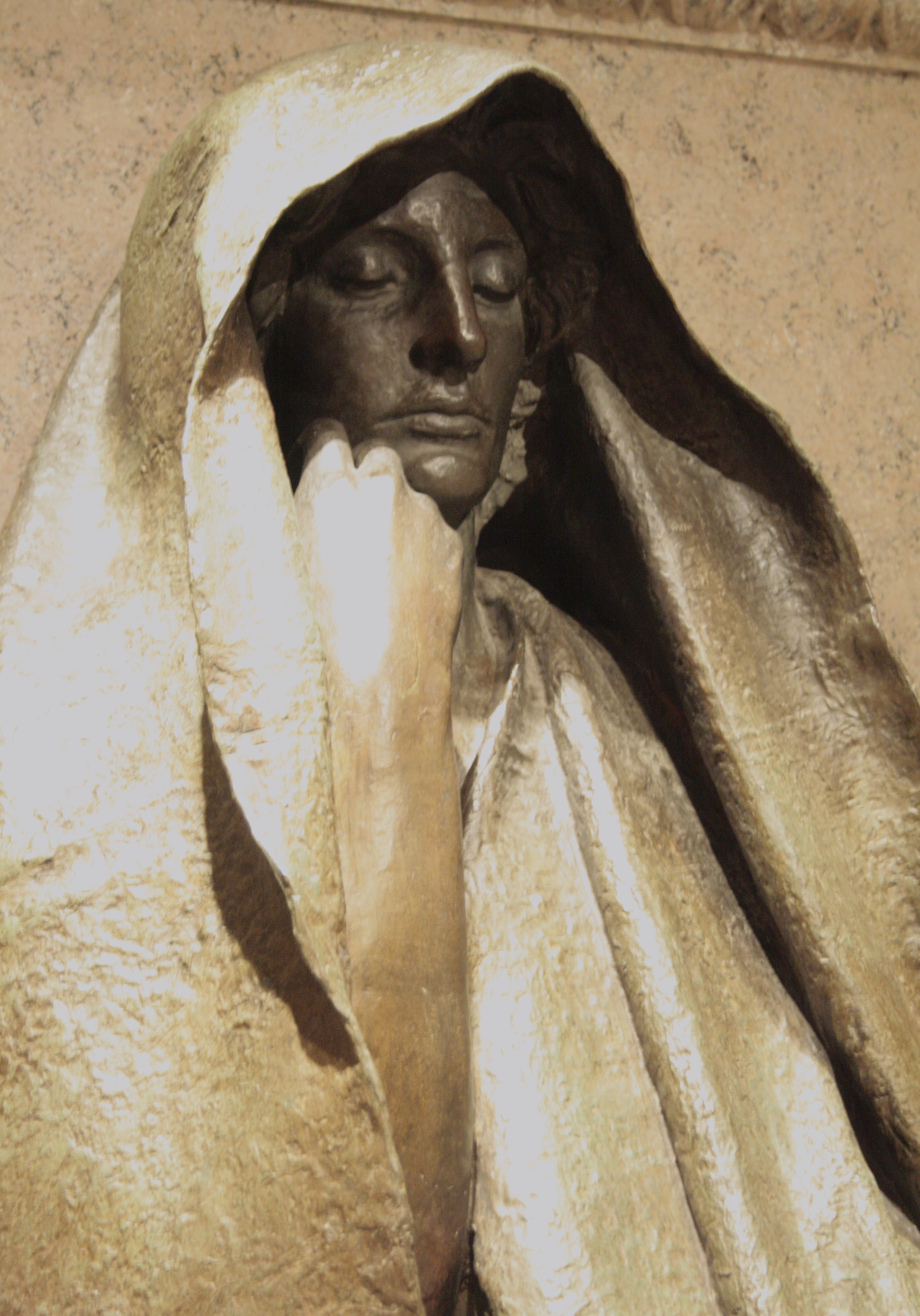
A close-up of the face.

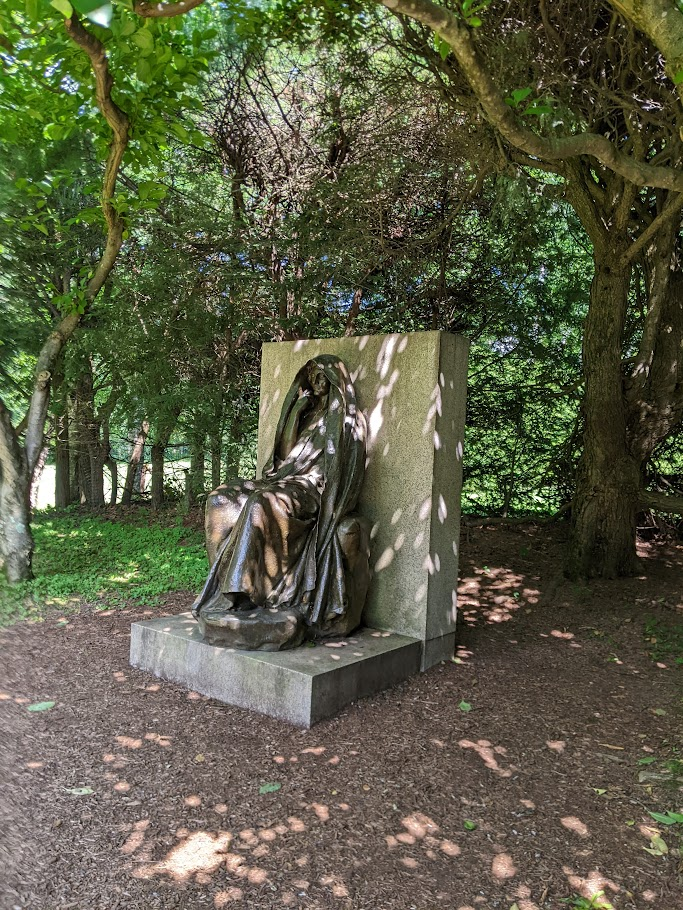
Reproduction at the Saint-Gaudens National Historical Park.
