= Rock Creek Cemetery =

United States historic place in Washington, D.C.

- U.S. National Register of Historic Places
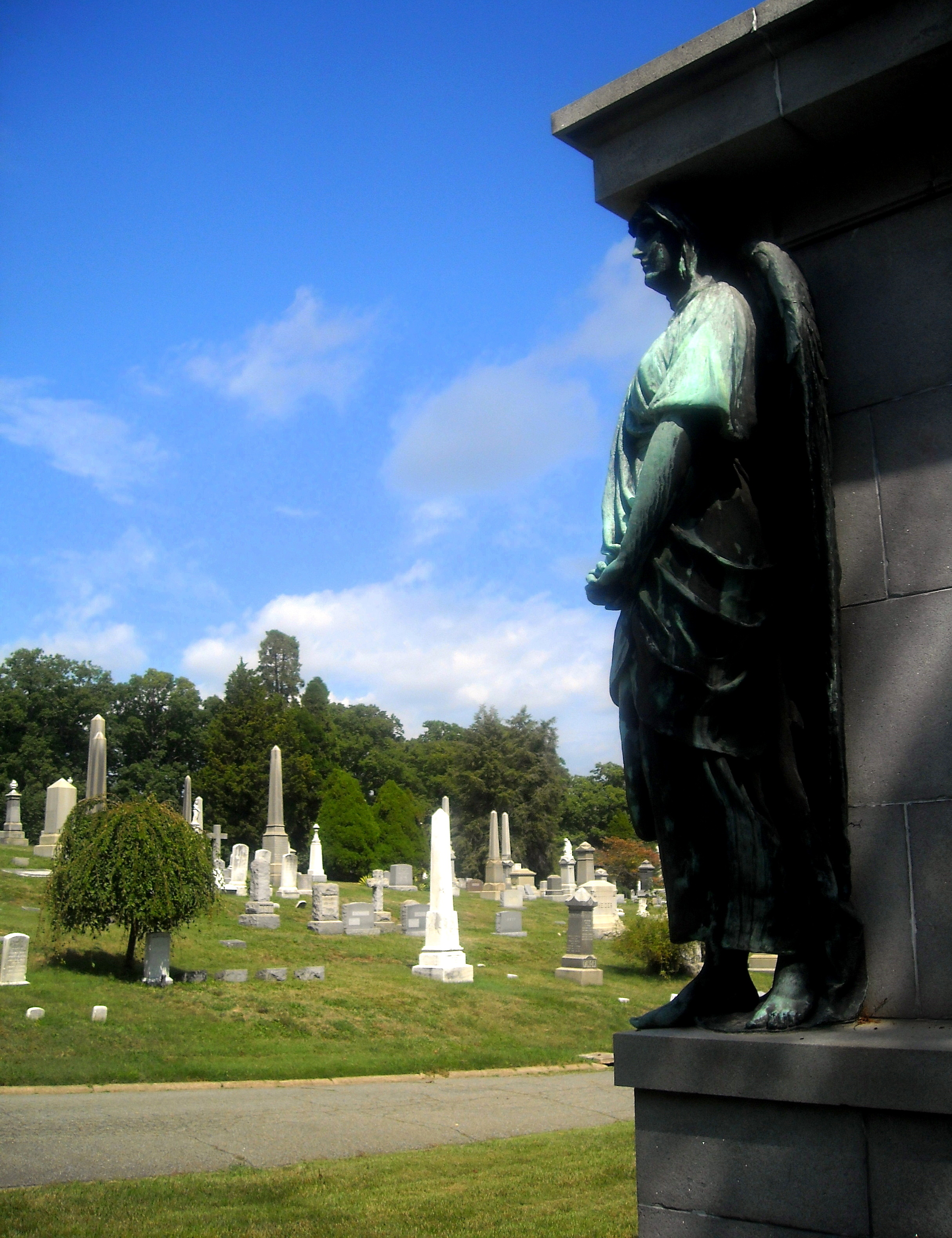
- Rock Creek Cemetery in September 2008

- Location within the District of Columbia Location within the United States
- Interactive map of Rock Creek Cemetery
- Location: Webster Street and Rock Creek Church Road, NW, Washington, D.C., U.S.
- Coordinates: 38°56′52″N 77°0′47″W
- Area: 84.2 acres (34.1 ha)
- Built: 1719
- Architectural style: Gothic Revival
- NRHP reference No.: 77001498
- Added to NRHP: August 12, 1977

Rock Creek Cemetery is an 86-acre (350,000 m^{2}) cemetery in the Petworth neighborhood of Washington, D.C., located across the street from the historic Soldiers' Home and the Soldiers' Home Cemetery. It also is home to the InterFaith Conference of Metropolitan Washington.

On August 12, 1977, Rock Creek Cemetery and the adjacent church grounds were listed on the National Register of Historic Places as Rock Creek Church Yard and Cemetery.

== History ==
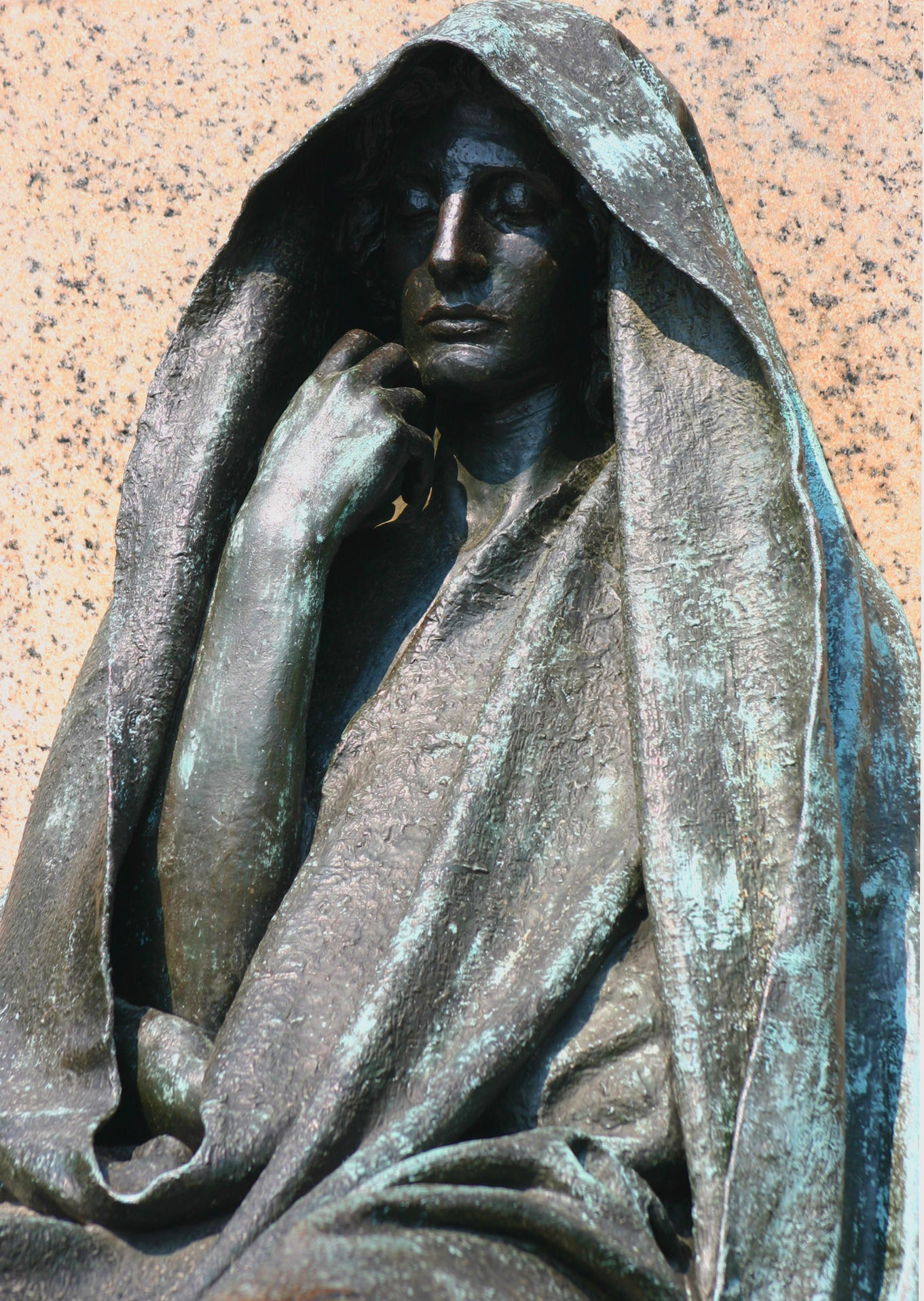
Adams Memorial, designed by sculptor Augustus Saint-Gaudens as a gravestone for Marian Hooper Adams, a Washington, D.C. socialite who committed suicide in 1885. A replica sits in the National Portrait Gallery.

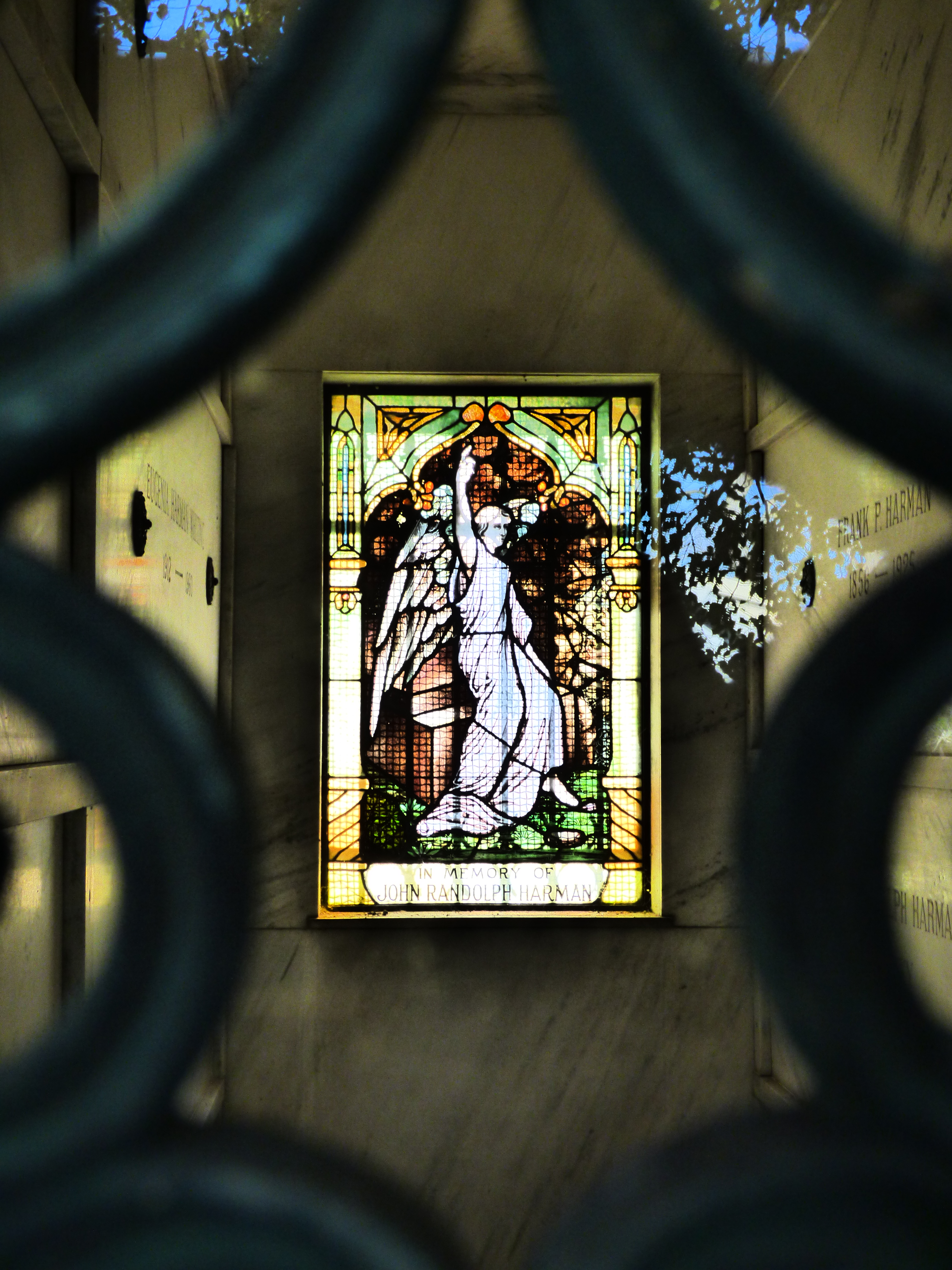
The mausoleum's interior at Rock Creek Cemetery

The cemetery was first established in 1719 in the British colonial Province of Maryland as a churchyard within the glebe of St. Paul's Episcopal Church within the Rock Creek Parish. Later, the vestry decided to expand the burial ground as a public cemetery to serve the city of Washington, D.C., which had acquired the cemetery within its boundaries as established in 1791. The cemetery was formally recognized and established through an Act of Congress in 1840.

An expanded cemetery was landscaped in the rural garden style, to function as both a cemetery and a public park. It is a ministry of St. Paul's Episcopal Church, Rock Creek Parish, with sections for St. John's Russian Orthodox Church and St. Nicholas Orthodox Cathedral.

The park-like setting of Rock Creek Cemetery has several notable mausoleums, sculptures, and tombstones. The best known is the Adams Memorial, a contemplative, androgynous bronze sculpture seated before a block of granite that was created by Augustus Saint-Gaudens and Stanford White. It marks the graves of Marian Hooper Adams and her husband, Henry Adams, and sometimes, mistakenly, the sculpture is referred to as Grief. Saint-Gaudens titled it The Mystery of the Hereafter and The Peace of God that Passeth Understanding.

Other notable memorials include the Frederick Keep Monument, the Heurich Mausoleum, the Hitt Monument, the Hardon Monument, the Kauffman Monument that is known as The Seven Ages of Memory, the Sherwood Mausoleum Door, and the Thompson-Harding Monument.

== Sculptors of works in the cemetery ==
- Gutzon Borglum, Rabboni, 1909
- James Earle Fraser, Frederick Keep Monument, 1920
- Laura Gardin Fraser, Hitt Memorial, 1931
- William Ordway Partridge, Kauffmann Memorial, also known as Seven Ages or Memory, 1897
- Brenda Putnam, Simon Memorial, 1917
- Vinnie Ream, Edwin B. Hay Monument, 1906
- Augustus Saint-Gaudens, Adams Memorial, 1890
- Mary Washburn, Waite Memorial, 1909
- Adolph Alexander Weinman, Spencer Memorial, after 1919

Numerous fine works by unknown sculptors also exist in the cemetery.

== Notable interments ==
=== A ===
- Cleveland Abbe (1838–1916), prominent meteorologist
- John James Abert (1788–1863), chief of the Corps of Topographical Engineers
- William Stretch Abert (1836–1867), Union Army officer
- Henry Adams (1838–1918), writer, descendant of two U.S. presidents; grave is marked by the Adams Memorial
- Clover Hooper Adams (1843–1885), Washington hostess and accomplished amateur photographer, wife of Henry Adams; grave is marked by the Adams Memorial
- Alice Warfield Allen (1869–1929), mother of the Duchess of Windsor, Wallis Simpson
- George V. Allen (1903–1970), U.S. ambassador
- Doug Allison (1846–1916), baseball player
- Thomas H. Anderson (1848–1916), associate judge of the Supreme Court of the District of Columbia
- Frank Crawford Armstrong (1835–1909), Confederate general
- Timothy P. Andrews (1794–1868), Union Army general and paymaster-general of the United States Army (1862–1864)
- James B. Aswell (1869–1931), educator and member of the U.S. House of Representatives from 1913 to 1931

=== B ===
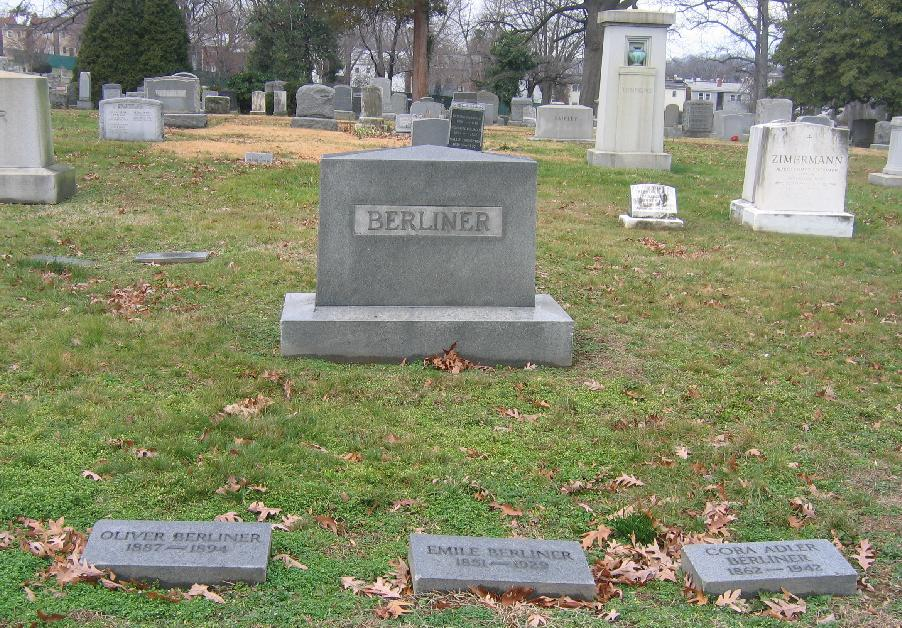
Gravesite of inventor Emile Berliner and his family members

- Joseph W. Babcock (1850–1909), businessman and U.S. Representative from Wisconsin
- Abraham Baldwin (1754–1807), U.S. Senator, signer of the U.S. Constitution, first president of the University of Georgia
- Cecil A. Beasley, Alabama state senator
- Willard L. Beaulac (1899–1990), U.S. Ambassador to Paraguay, Colombia, Cuba, Chile and Argentina
- Melville Bell (1819–1905), Scottish teacher and inventor, father of Alexander Graham Bell, Hubbard Bell Grossman Pillot Memorial
  - Eliza Grace Symonds Bell, wife of Alexander Melville Bell
- Joseph Bray Bennett (1833–1913), Wisconsin state senator and appointments clerk at the U.S. Department of Agriculture
- Andrew H. Berding, journalist and former Assistant Secretary of State for Public Affairs
- Emile Berliner (1851–1929), German-born American inventor of the gramophone
- Arthur A. Birney (1852–1916), U.S. Attorney for the District of Columbia
- John W. Bischoff (1850–1909), composer and organist.
- Eliza Violet Blair (1794–1877), journalist and hostess
- Francis Preston Blair (1791–1876), journalist and newspaper editor
- Montgomery Blair (1813–1883), Abraham Lincoln's Postmaster General
- Ben H. Brown Jr. (1914–1989), former United States ambassador to Liberia
- Glenn Brown (1854–1932), architect and historian
- Robert C. Buchanan (1811–1878), military general during the American Civil War and the Mexican War
- David Burnes (1739–1799), D.C. landowner
- Robert N. Butler (1927–2010), gerontologist

=== C ===
- Charles Baltimore Calvert (1848–1906), Maryland state politician
- Camille Chautemps (1885–1963), prime minister of France
- Edward Clark (1822–1902), Architect of the Capitol
- Catherine Cate Coblentz (1897–1951), writer, wife of William Coblentz
- William Coblentz (1873–1962), physicist, notable for pioneer contributions to infrared radiometry and spectroscopy
- Martin F. Conway (1827–1882), U.S. congressman from Kansas and consul to France
- William Eleroy Curtis (1850–1911), journalist, diplomat, and advocate of Pan-Americanism

=== D ===
- Evelyn Y. Davis (1929–2018), American activist shareholder.
- S. Wallace Dempsey (1862–1949), Republican politician
- Hubert Dilger (1836–1911), American Civil War artillerist, captain in the Union Army, Medal of Honor recipient
- J. Maury Dove (1855–1924), business executive and hotelier
- Gerald A. Drew (1903–1970), United States ambassador to Haiti and Bolivia
- Roscoe Drummond (1902–1983), journalist and editor
- Amanda Ruter Dufour (1822–1899), poet
- John Wilbur Dwight (1859–1928), U.S. Representative from New York

=== E ===
- Susan Ann Edson (1823–1897), personal physician to President James A. Garfield
- Henry Jackson Ellicott (1847–1901), sculptor and architectural sculptor
- Matthew Gault Emery (1818–1901), mayor of Washington, D.C., from 1870 to 1871
- Helen Essary (1886–1951), journalist
- Henry Ellsworth Ewing (1883–1951), arachnologist

=== F ===
- Charles S. Fairfax (1829–1869), Virginia-born California politician who was entitled to the British title 10th Lord Fairfax of Cameron
- Stephen Johnson Field (1816–1899), Associate justice of US Supreme Court
- Peter Force (1790–1868), politician, U.S. Army lieutenant in the War of 1812, newspaper editor, archivist, and historian, who served as the twelfth mayor of Washington, D.C., and whose library of historical documents became the first major Americana collection of the Library of Congress
- Garrett Ford Sr. (1945-2025), Professional football player, for the Denver Broncos
- Israel Moore Foster (1873–1950), Republican member of the U.S. House of Representatives
- William H. French (1815–1881), major general during the American Civil War and the Mexican War

=== G ===
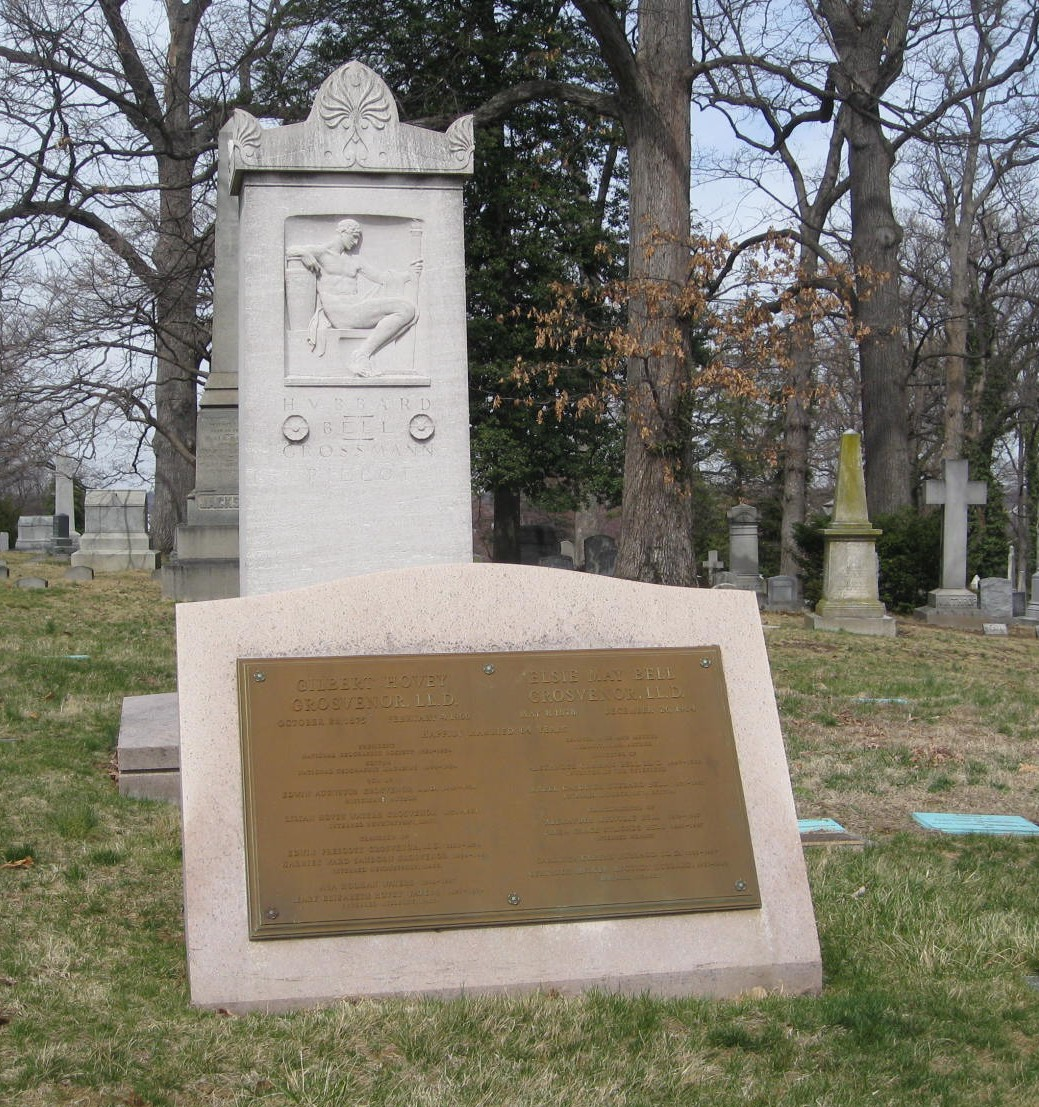
Gravesite of Gilbert Hovey Grosvenor, an editor of National Geographic

- Julius Garfinckel (1872–1936), merchant, founder of Washington department store, Garfinckel's
- Harry Post Godwin (1857–1900) Chief Editor of the National Republican, Washington Star
- Gilbert Hovey Grosvenor (1875–1966), president of the National Geographic Society, Hubbard Bell Grossman Pillot Memorial
- Melville Bell Grosvenor (1901–1982), National Geographic Magazine editor

=== H ===
- Mary Berri Chapman Hansbrough (1872–1951), poet and painter
- John Marshall Harlan (1833–1911), Supreme Court associate justice, known as the "Great Dissenter"; wrote the lone dissenting opinion in Plessy v. Ferguson
- Malvina Shanklin Harlan (1839–1916), writer
- Patricia Roberts Harris (1924–1985), ambassador, first African-American woman to serve in a presidential cabinet
- George L. Harrison (1887–1958), banker, insurance executive, and political advisor during World War II
- Patricia McMahon Hawkins (1949–2021), diplomat
- Frank Hatton (1846–1894), U.S. postmaster general and editor of the Washington Post
- Christian Heurich (1842–1945), German-born American founder of Heurich Brewery (1871–1954); Heurich Mausoleum
- J. N. B. Hewitt (1859–1937), linguist and enthnographer
- Samuel Billingsley Hill (1875–1958), U.S. representative from Washington and member of the United States Board of Tax Appeals (now the United States Tax Court)
- Lemon G. Hine (1832–1914), member of the D.C. board of commissioners
- William Henry Holmes (1846–1933), known for scientific illustration of the American West, his role in the controversy over the antiquity of humans in the Americas, and leadership at the Smithsonian Institution

=== J ===
- Charles Francis Jenkins (1867–1934), television and motion picture pioneer
- Nelson T. Johnson (1887–1954), ambassador
- James Kimbrough Jones (1839–1908), politician
- John Johnson (1842–1907), Medal of Honor recipient
- Opha May Johnson (1879–1955), 1st known female U.S. Marine (1918)

=== K ===
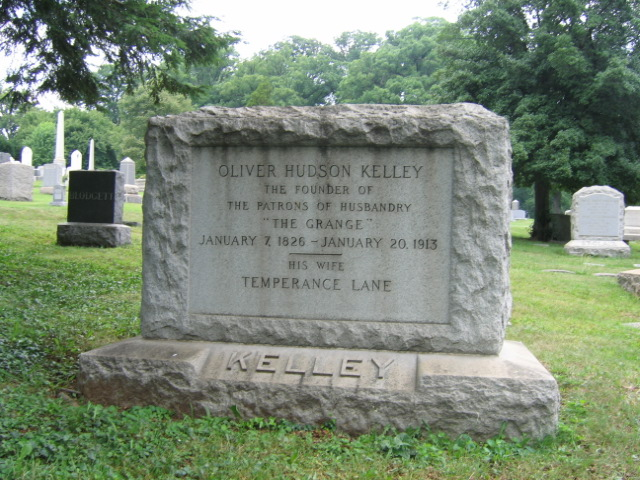
Gravesite of Oliver Hudson Kelley, who founded the National Grange of the Order of Patrons of Husbandry

- Samuel H. Kauffmann (1829–1906) newspaper publisher
- Oliver Hudson Kelley (1826–1913), a founder of the Order of the Patrons of Husbandry (The Grange)
- Margaret Sherratt Keys (1856-1942), British-born American artist, china painter, store proprietor
- Angela Jurdak Khoury (1915–2011), Lebanon's first female diplomat and esteemed member of the Lebanese delegation to the United Nations.
- Sergei Kourdakov (1951–1973), a former KGB agent who defected to Canada from the Soviet Union

=== L ===
- Bruce Laingen (1922–2019), diplomat
- Richard Lawrence (1800–1861), attempted assassin of President Andrew Jackson
- Jane Lawton (1944–2007), Maryland Democratic politician, member of the Maryland House of Delegates
- Blair Lee I (1857–1944), U.S. Senator from Maryland
- Blair Lee III (1916–1985), Democratic politician
- George E. Lemon (?–1896), patent lawyer and founder of the journal National Tribune
- Walter Lenox (1817–1874), mayor of Washington from 1850 to 1852
- John Lenthall (1807–1882), naval architect and shipbuilder, Chief Constructor of the Navy from 1849 to 1853 and chief of the United States Navy's Bureau of Construction and Repair from 1853 to 1871
- Fulton Lewis (1903–1966), radio and television broadcaster
- George W. Littlehales, (1860-1943) oceanographer of the United States Hydrographic Office
- Alice Roosevelt Longworth (1884–1980), Republican Party icon, daughter of Theodore Roosevelt
- Anthony Francis Lucas (1855–1921), Croatian-born mechanical engineer

=== M ===
- Arthur MacArthur Sr. (1815–1896), 4th Governor of Wisconsin, grandfather of General Douglas MacArthur
- Frank Mankiewicz (1924–2014), journalist and political adviser
- Jackie Martin (1903–1969), newspaperwoman
- Anna Broom McCeney (1850–1903), mother of vaudeville performer La Belle Titcomb (Heloise McCeney)
- Hugh McCulloch (1808–1895), Secretary of the Treasury
- George McGovern (1922–2012), Democratic presidential nominee in 1972 and senator from South Dakota
- Dempster McIntosh (1896–1984), ambassador
- Evalyn Walsh McLean (1886–1947), wealthy heiress, one–time owner of the Hope Diamond and the Washington Post
- Washington McLean (1816–1890), businessman, owner of the Cincinnati Enquirer newspaper
- John Gordon Mein (1913–1968), ambassador
- William Rush Merriam, (1849–1931), governor of Minnesota, father of the United States Census Bureau
- Mihran Mesrobian (1889–1975), Armenian-American architect

=== N ===
- Elizabeth Norment (1952–2014), actress
- Michael Novak (1933–2017), philosopher and journalist

=== O ===
- Carmel Offie (1909–1972), Central Intelligence Agency official

=== P ===
- Thomas Nelson Page (1853–1922), First Families of Virginia descendant, attorney, ambassador to Italy, and Southern writer
- Stephan Panaretoff (1853–1931), educator and the first Bulgarian minister plenipotentiary to the United States
- William Paret (1826–1911), sixth Episcopal Bishop of Maryland
- Rosalie Mackenzie Poe (1810–1874), poet and sister of Edgar Allan Poe
- Terence Powderly (1849–1924), longtime leader of the Knights of Labor
- Robert Prosky (1930–2008), actor

=== R ===
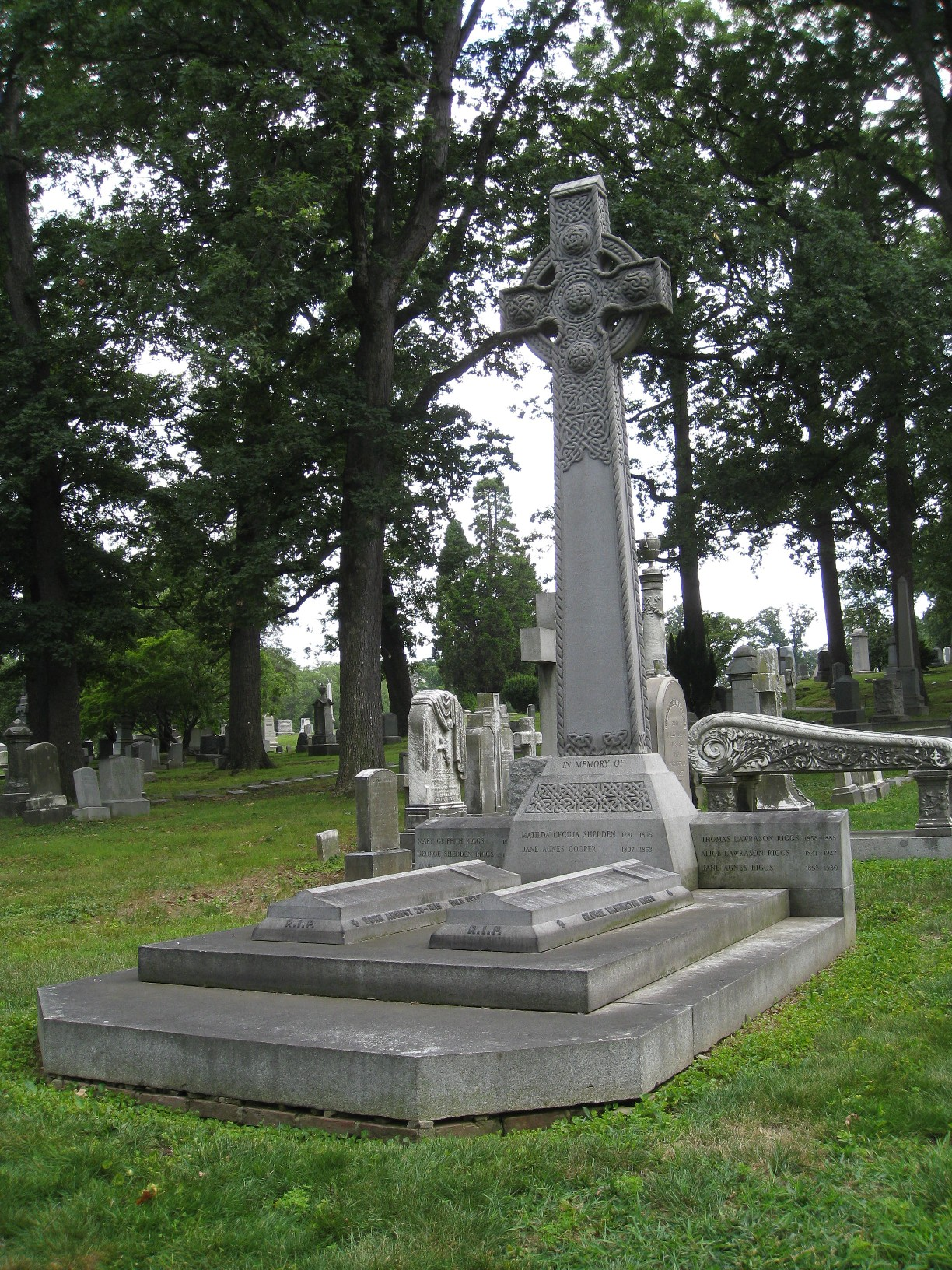
Gravesite of George Washington Riggs

- John B. Raymond (1844–1886), politician
- Isidor Rayner (1850–1912), Democratic politician, U.S. senator from Maryland
- George Washington Riggs (1813–1881), banker, founder of Riggs Bank
- William A. Rodenberg (1865–1937), politician
- Frederick Rodgers (1842–1917), United States Navy rear admiral
- Basil Rodzianko (1915–1999), Bishop of Orthodox Church in America Diocese of the West
- Tim Russert (1950–2008), journalist, host of Meet the Press

=== S ===
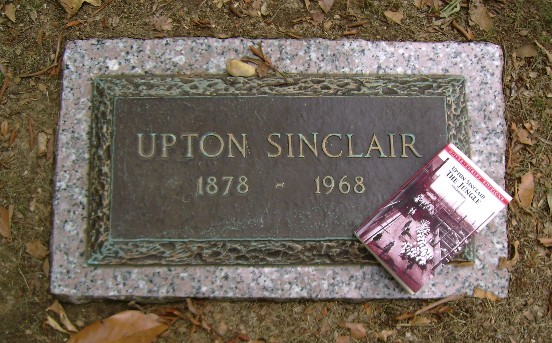
Gravesite of Upton Sinclair

- Alexander Robey Shepherd (1835–1902), politician, governor of District of Columbia from 1873 to 1874
- Charles Carroll Simms (1824–1884), U.S. Navy and Confederate States Navy officer
- Thetus W. Sims (1852–1939), politician and a member of the United States House of Representatives for the eighth congressional district of Tennessee from 1897 to 1921
- Upton Sinclair (1878–1968), author, Pulitzer Prize winner
- Alfred Edgar Smith (1903–1986), journalist and civil rights leader
- Ethel M. Smith (1877–1951), activist and social reformer.
- Frank M. Snowden Jr. (1911–2007), historian and classicist
- Ainsworth Rand Spofford (1825–1908), journalist and publisher, sixth Librarian of the United States Congress from 1864 to 1897
- Harlan Fiske Stone (1872–1946), Chief Justice of the United States
- Robert King Stone (1822–1872), physician and educator
- Paulina Longworth Sturm (1925–1957), daughter of Alice Roosevelt and granddaughter of Theodore Roosevelt
- Thomas Sweeney (1903–1973), West Virginia state politician

=== T ===
- Abner Taylor (1829–1903), politician
- George Taylor (1820–1894), attorney and Democratic politician
- Florence Calvert Thorne (1877–1973), labor activist
- Thomas Weston Tipton (1817–1899), U.S. senator from Nebraska
- Ariadna Tyrkova-Williams (1869–1962), Russian-American writer and journalist

=== V ===
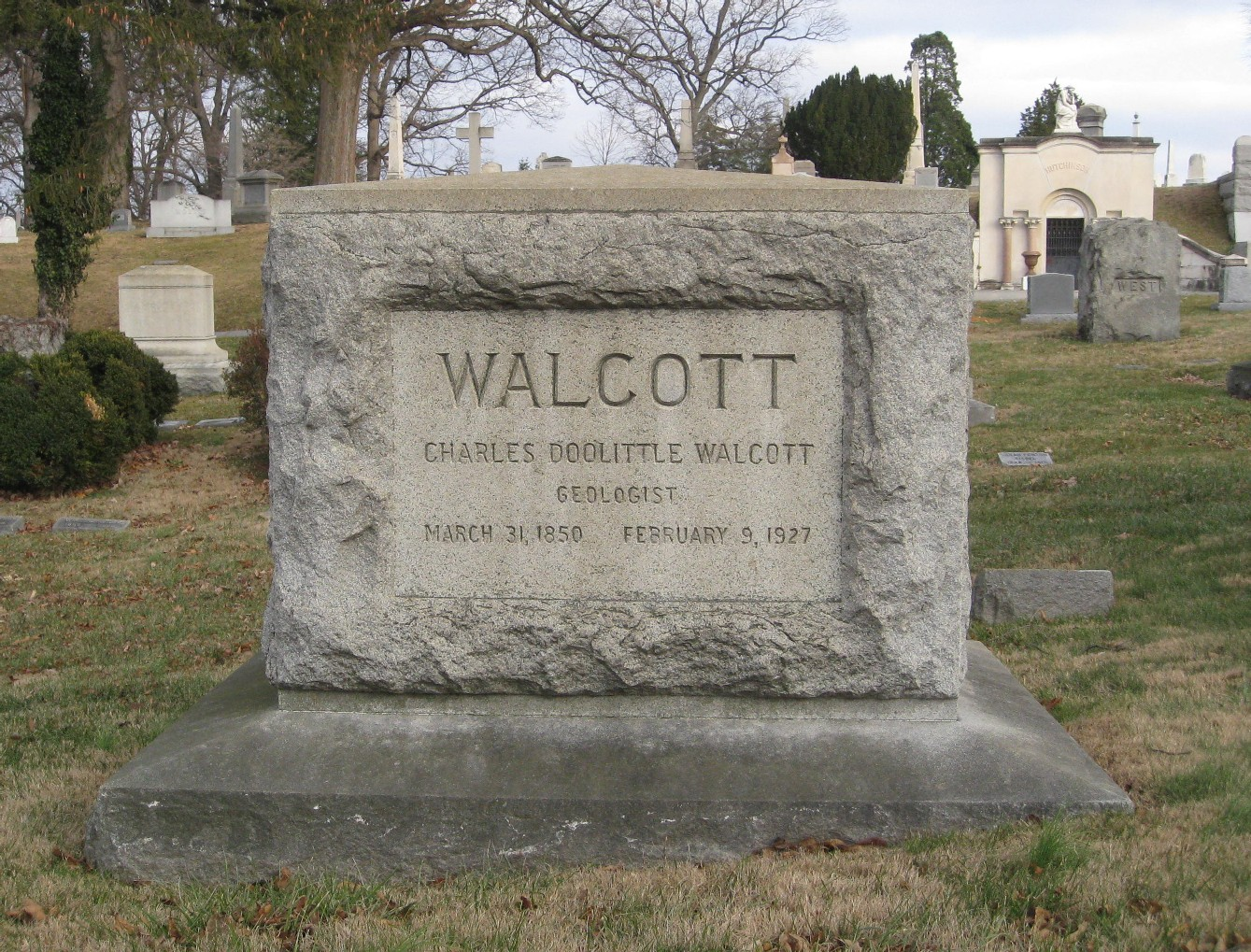
Gravesite of Charles Doolittle Walcott

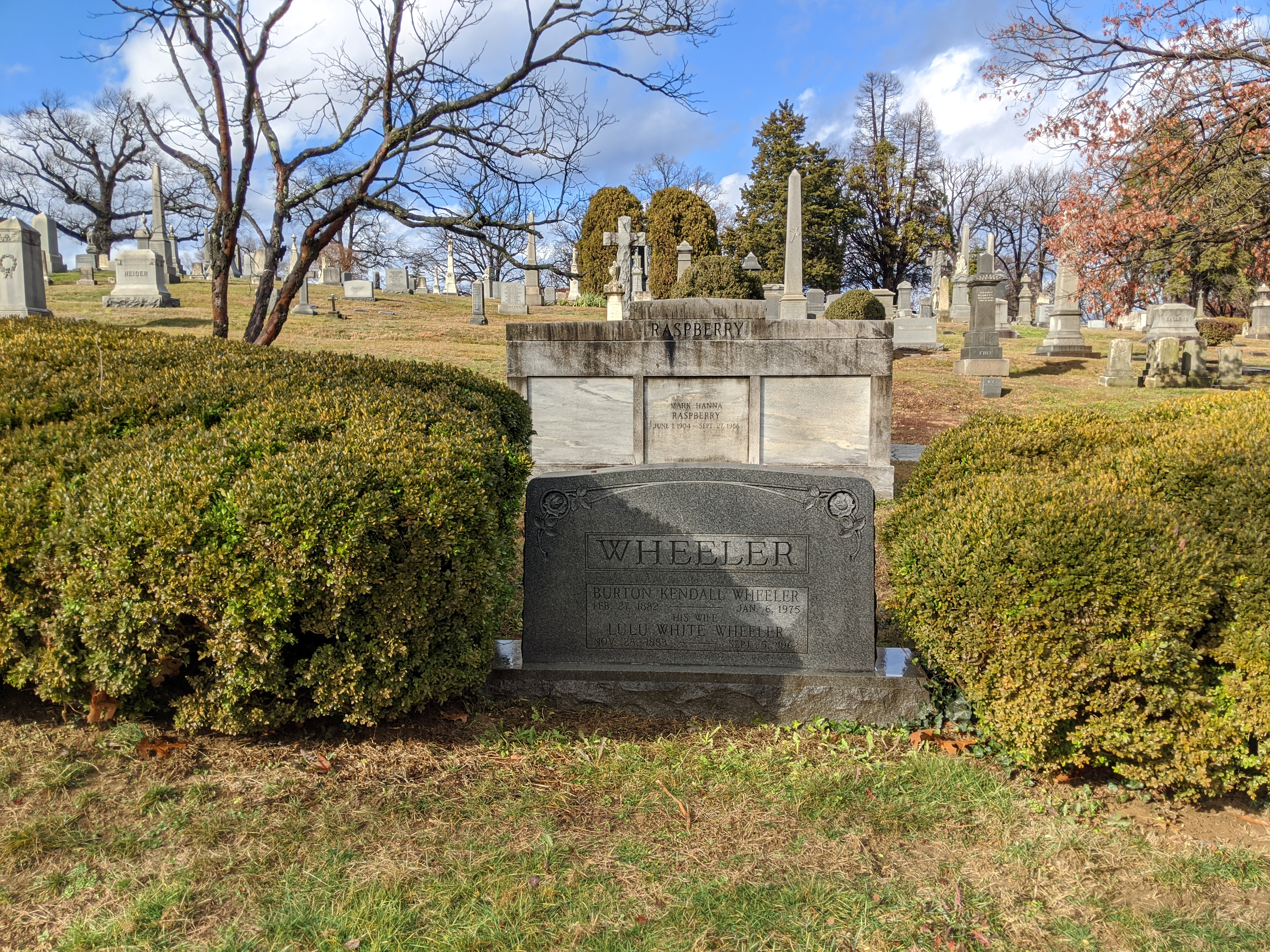
Grave of Burton K. Wheeler

- Tran Van Chuong (1898–1986), South Vietnam's ambassador to the U.S., appointed by Ngo Dinh Diem
- Willis Van Devanter (1859–1941), U.S. Supreme Court associate justice
- George Vasey (1822–1893), botanist and physician
- Gore Vidal (1925–2012), author and playwright, next to his companion of 50 years Howard Austen.

=== W ===
- Edward T. Wailes (1903–1969), U.S. Ambassador to Czechoslovakia, Iran, Hungary and South Africa
- Charles Doolittle Walcott (1850–1927), Secretary of the Smithsonian Institution
- Benjamin H. Warder (1824–1894), manufacturer of agricultural machinery
- Paul Warnke (1920–2001), diplomat, assistant secretary of state from 1966 to 1969; SALT Negotiator and Director of the Arms Control and disarmament Agency under President Clinton
- Sumner Welles (1892–1961), diplomat, undersecretary of State from 1937 to 1943
- Burton K. Wheeler (1882–1975), Democratic politician and U.S. senator from Montana
- James Alexander Williamson (1829–1902), Union Army general during the American Civil War, Medal of Honor recipient
- John Wilson (1807–1876), U.S. Treasury and Department of the Interior official
- Richard L. Wilson (1905–1981), journalist
- William Windom (1827–1891), U.S. representative, senator, secretary of the treasury (under James Garfield & Benjamin Harrison)
- Otis Wingo (1877–1930), U.S. representative from Arkansas's 4th congressional district, 1913–1930
- Willie Wood (1936–2020), football player
- John Vines Wright (1828–1908), U.S. representative from Tennessee, member of the Confederate Congress, judge of the Tennessee Supreme Court

=== Y ===
- Helen Yakobson, (1913–2002) academic and professor at George Washington University

== See also ==
- List of burial places of justices of the Supreme Court of the United States
- List of cemeteries in the United States
