= Hubbard Bell Grossman Pillot Memorial =

Artwork in Rock Creek Cemetery, Washington, DC

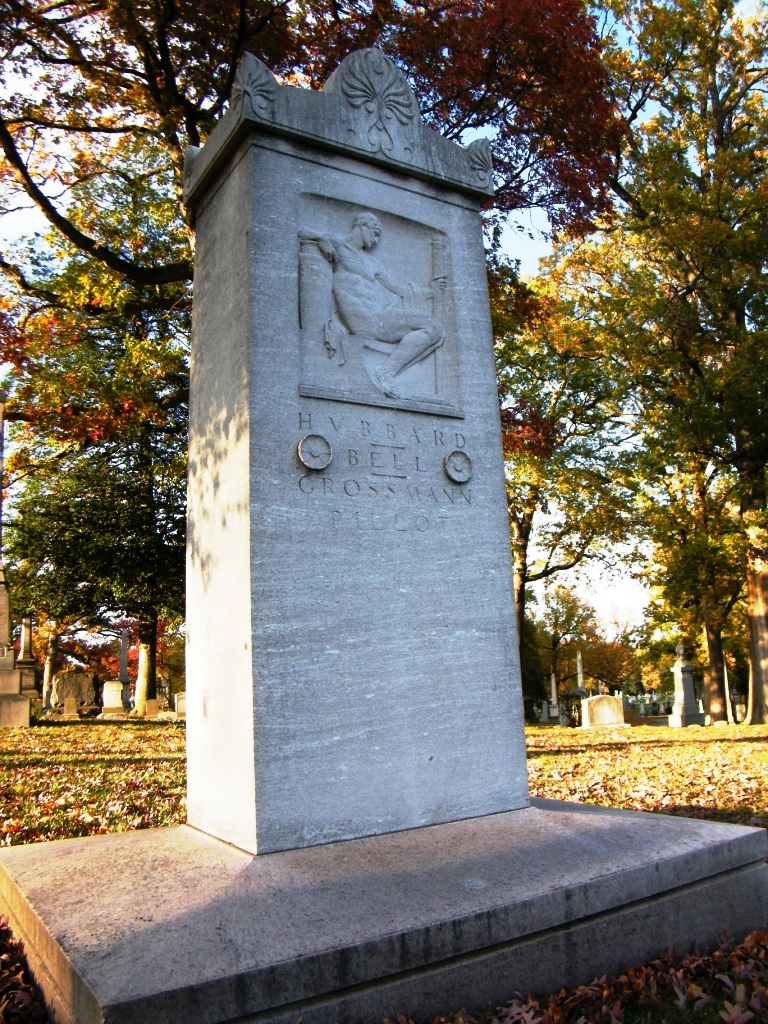
- Artist: Lee Oskar Lawrie
- Type: Marble
- Location: Washington, D.C., United States; 38°56′51.58″N 77°0′40.2″W
- Owner: Rock Creek Cemetery

Hubbard Bell Grossman Pillot Memorial is a public artwork by Lee Lawrie, located at Rock Creek Cemetery in Washington, D.C., United States. "Hubbard Bell Grossman Pillot Memorial" was originally surveyed as part of the Smithsonian's Inventories of American Painting and Sculpture survey in 1967–1969.

== Description ==
This grave site memorial is a tall marble stele with relief carvings showing a classical nude male seated with his body turned to the right showing his profile. In his left hand he holds a torch and his right arm rests on an urn.

The front is inscribed:

HUBBARD
BELL
GROSSMAN
PILLOT

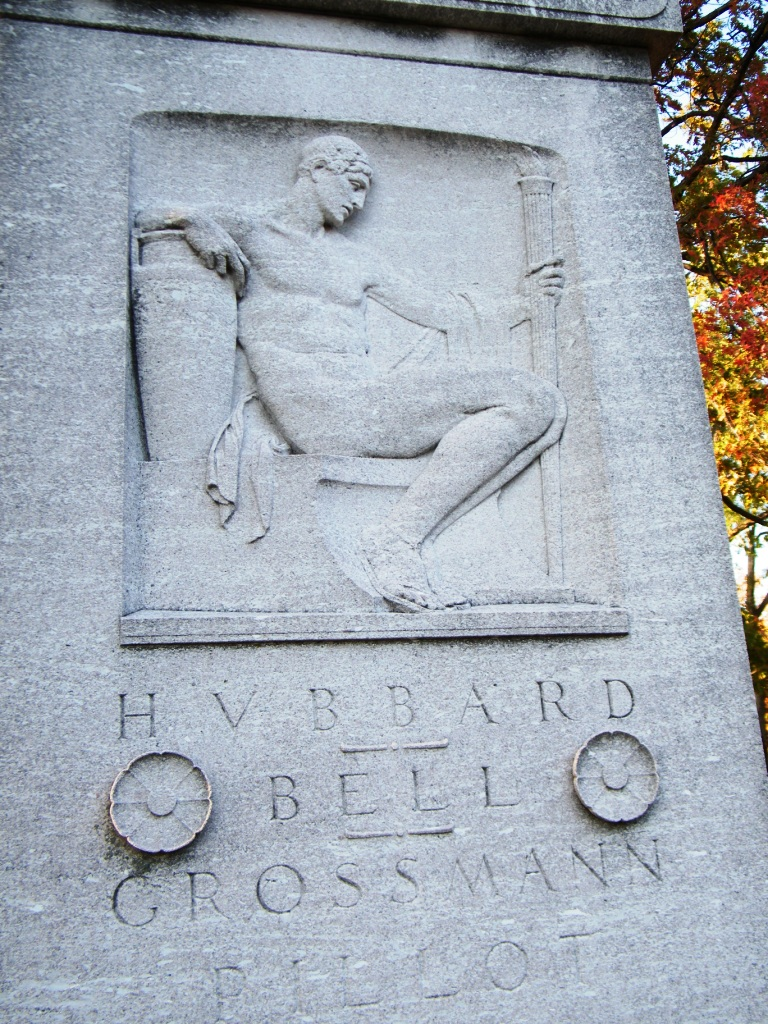

== Information ==
This grave site serves as the final resting place for National Geographic editor Gilbert Hovey Grosvenor and his wife Elsie May Bell (daughter of Alexander Graham Bell). Alexander Graham Bell's parents, Alexander Melville Bell and Eliza Grace Symonds Bell, are also buried here along with fourteen other individuals marked by bronze markers.
