= Cecil A. Beasley =

American politician (1876–1959)

- Born: December 20, 1876; Fayette, Alabama, U.S.
- Died: September 23, 1959 (aged 82); Washington, D.C., U.S.
- Resting place: Rock Creek Cemetery; Washington, D.C., U.S.
- Education: Alabama State Normal College; University of Alabama
- Occupations: Lawyer, politician
- Spouse: Louise Robertson
- Parent(s): W. L. Beasley; Sarah Howell

Cecil A. Beasley (1876–1959) was an American lawyer and politician.

== Early life ==
Cecil A. Beasley was born on December 20, 1876, in Fayette, Alabama.

Beasley graduated from Alabama State Normal College in Florence, Alabama, in 1896. He graduated from the University of Alabama in Tuscaloosa in 1900. While in college, he joined Sigma Alpha Epsilon.

== Career ==
Beasley was an attorney with the firm Beasley and Wright. He served as a member of the Alabama Senate. He was the assistant to John H. Bankhead.

Beasley was a member of the Royal Arch Masonry, the Knights of Pythias and the Odd Fellows.

== Personal life ==
Beasley married Louise Robertson. They resided in Fayette, Alabama.

== Death ==
Beasley died on September 23, 1959, in Washington, D.C. He was buried at the Rock Creek Cemetery.
