= Visible Speech =

Featural phonetic representation script

- Script type: Alphabet
- Creator: Alexander Melville Bell
- Period: 1867 to the present
- Direction: Left-to-right

ISO 15924
- ISO 15924: Visp (280), Visible Speech

Unicode
- Unicode range: U+E780 to U+E7FF in the ConScript Unicode Registry

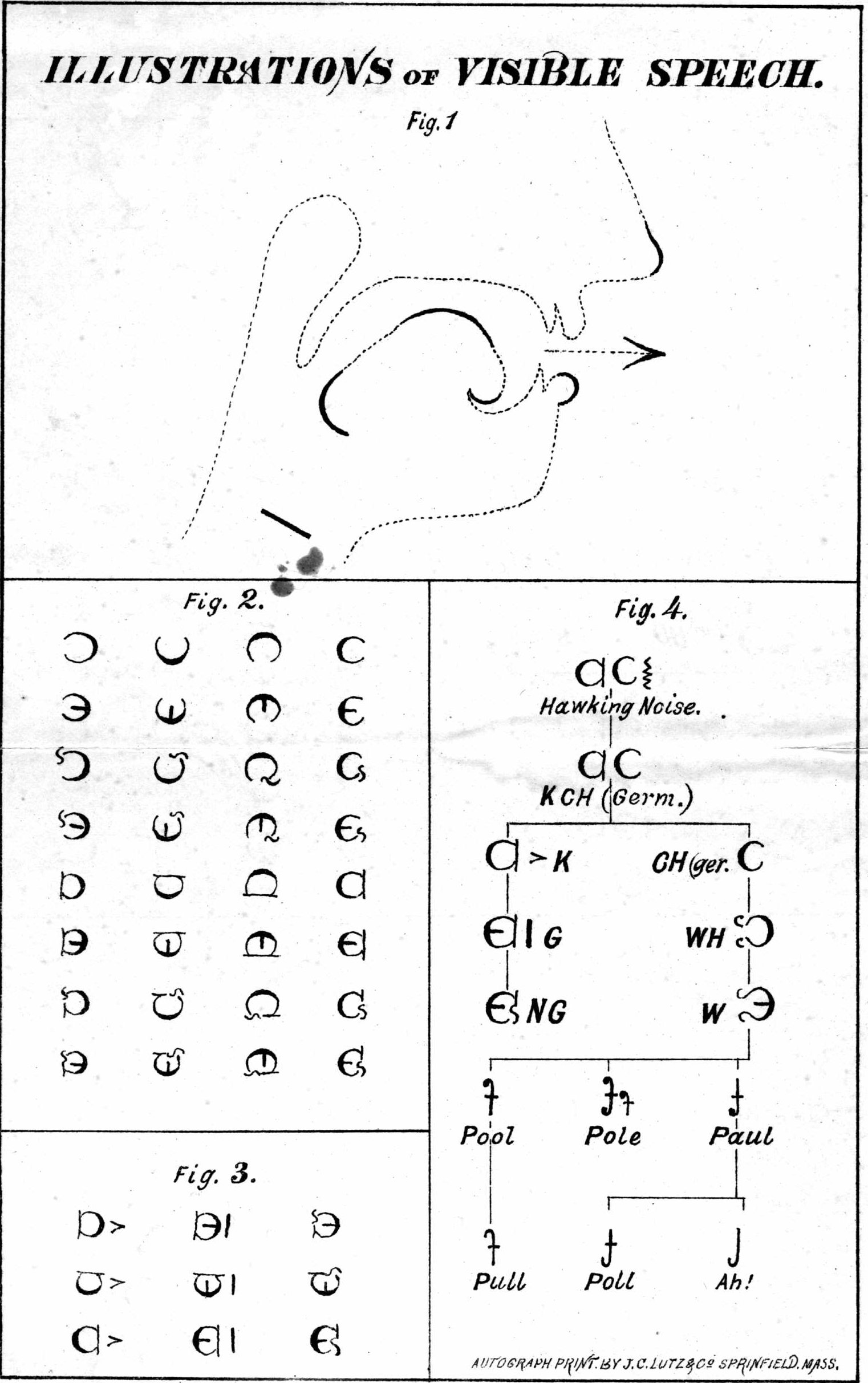
Illustrations of Visible Speech

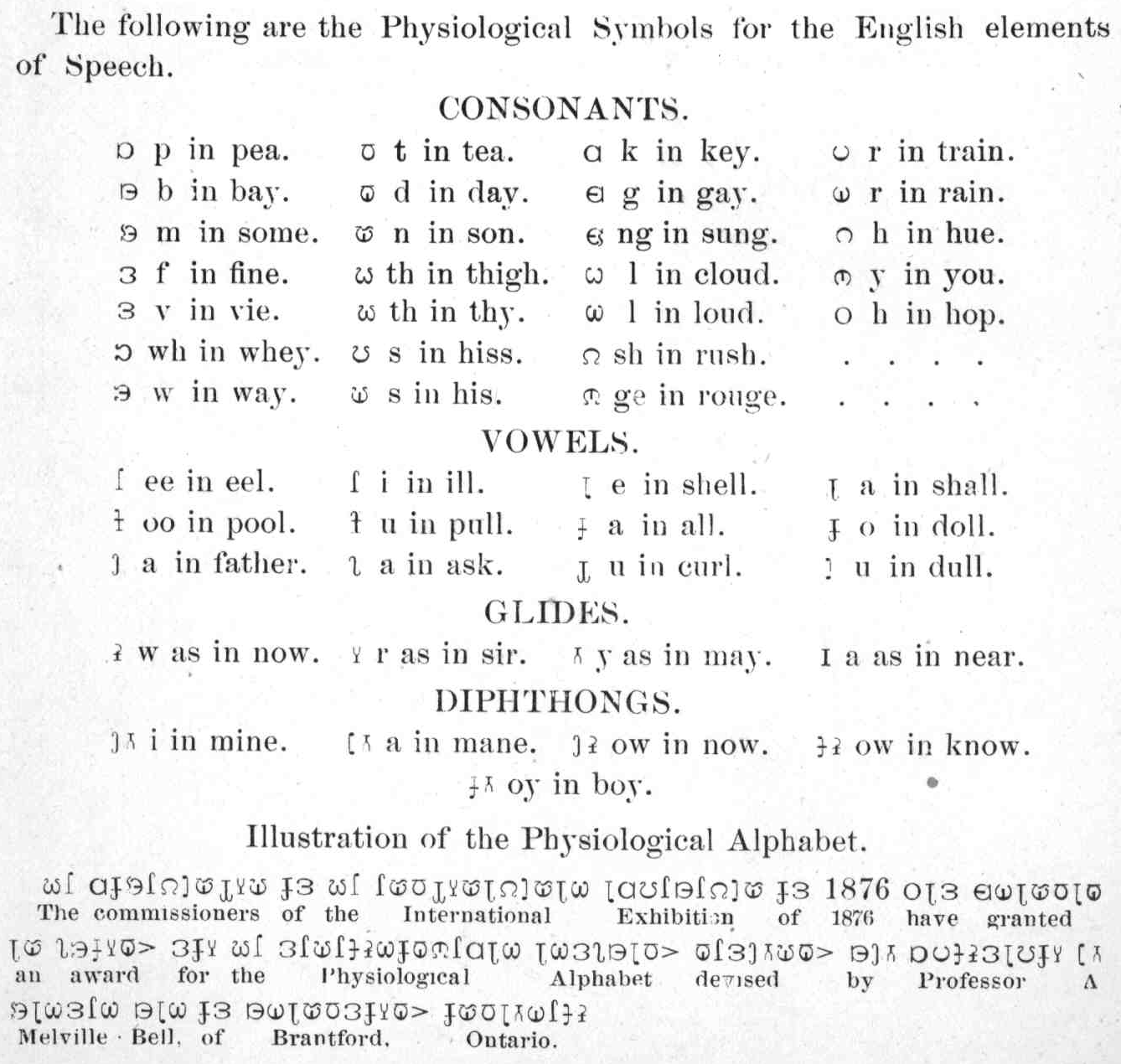
Chart of English sounds and corresponding Visible Speech characters

Visible Speech is a system of phonetic symbols developed by British linguist Alexander Melville Bell in 1867 to represent the position of the speech organs in articulating sounds. Bell was known internationally as a teacher of speech and proper elocution and an author of books on the subject. The system is composed of symbols that show the position and movement of the throat, tongue, and lips as they produce the sounds of language, and it is a type of phonetic notation. The system was used to aid the deaf in learning to speak.

== Design ==
The characters in Visible Speech were designed by Bell to visually resemble the mouth and tongue positions they represented. Since it could represent sounds of any language, Bell termed it "Universal Alphabetics".

== History ==
In 1867, Alexander Melville Bell published Visible Speech: The Science of Universal Alphabetics. A person reading a piece of text handwritten in Melville Bell's system of characters could accurately reproduce a sentence the way it would be spoken by someone with an accent. In demonstrations, Melville Bell employed his son, Alexander Graham Bell to read from the visible speech transcript of the volunteer's spoken words and would say it back exactly as the volunteer had spoken it.

In 1864, Melville promoted his first works on Visible Speech, in order to help the deaf both learn and improve upon their speech (since the profoundly deaf could not hear their own pronunciation). To help promote the system, Bell created two written short forms using his system of 29 modifiers and tones, 52 consonants, 36 vowels and a dozen diphthongs: they were named World English, which was similar to the International Phonetic Alphabet, and also Line Writing, used as a shorthand form for stenographers.

Bell's son Alexander Graham Bell learned the symbols, assisted his father in giving public demonstrations of the system and mastered it to the point that he later improved upon his father's work. Eventually, Alexander Graham Bell became a powerful advocate of Visible Speech and oralism in the United States. The money he earned from his patent of the telephone and the sale of his Volta Laboratory patents aided in his advocacy.

Melville's works on Visible Speech became highly notable, and were described by Édouard Séguin as being "...a greater invention than the telephone by his son, Alexander Graham Bell". Melville saw numerous applications for his invention, including its worldwide use as a universal language. However, although heavily promoted at the Second International Congress on Education of the Deaf in Milan, Italy in 1880, after a period of a dozen years or so of use in deaf education, Visible Speech was found to be more cumbersome — and thus a hindrance — to the teaching of speech to the deaf, compared to other methods. For these reasons, it eventually faded from use.

=== Later systems ===
Alexander Graham Bell later devised another system of visual cues that also came to be known as visible speech, though it differed from Visible Speech. Graham Bell's system, developed at his Volta Laboratory in Washington, D.C., involved the use of a spectrogram, a device that makes "visible records of the frequency, intensity, and time analysis of short samples of speech". The spectrogram translated sounds into readable patterns via a photographic process. This system was based on the idea that the eye should be able to read patterns of vocalizations in much the same way that the ear translates these vocalizations into meaning. Modern implementations of Bell's idea display sound spectra in real time and are used in phonology, speech therapy and computer speech recognition.

== See also ==
- International English
- Second International Congress on Education of the Deaf
- Universal language
- Volta Laboratory and Bureau
- Hangul
