= Samuel H. Kauffmann =

American publisher (1829–1906)

Samuel H. Kaufmann
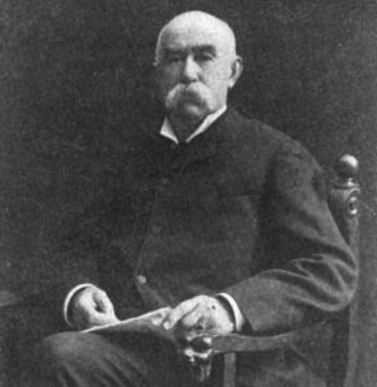
- Born: April 30, 1829; Wayne County, Ohio, U.S.
- Died: March 15, 1906 (aged 76); Washington, D.C., U.S.
- Resting place: Rock Creek Cemetery; Washington, D.C., U.S.
- Occupation: Newspaper publisher

Samuel Hay Kaufmann (April 30, 1829 – March 15, 1906) was an American newspaper publisher who was the former owner of the Washington Star. He also served as president of the Corcoran Gallery of Art and is credited with helping to expand both the Corcoran and the Smithsonian.

== Life ==
Kauffmann was born in Wayne County, Ohio, and began working as a telegraph operator in Wooster, Ohio. In 1854 he became the publisher of a newspaper in Zanesville, Ohio, continuing that until he moved to Washington, D.C., in 1861. In Washington, he was a bank director and worked in insurance. He was on the Board of Trade.

Starting in 1891, Kauffman served as president of the Corcoran Gallery of Art. Kauffman is credited with helping to expand both the Corcoran and the Smithsonian. During his tenure he became a patron of painter Max Weyl, supporting the painters career and helping to bring Weyl's work to the forefront of Washington's art community.

Kauffmann died at his home in Washington, D.C., on March 15, 1906. He was buried at Rock Creek Cemetery.

The Kauffmann Memorial was built in his honor by William Ordway Partridge in Rock Creek Cemetery.
