= Mary Berri Chapman Hansbrough =

American poet and painter

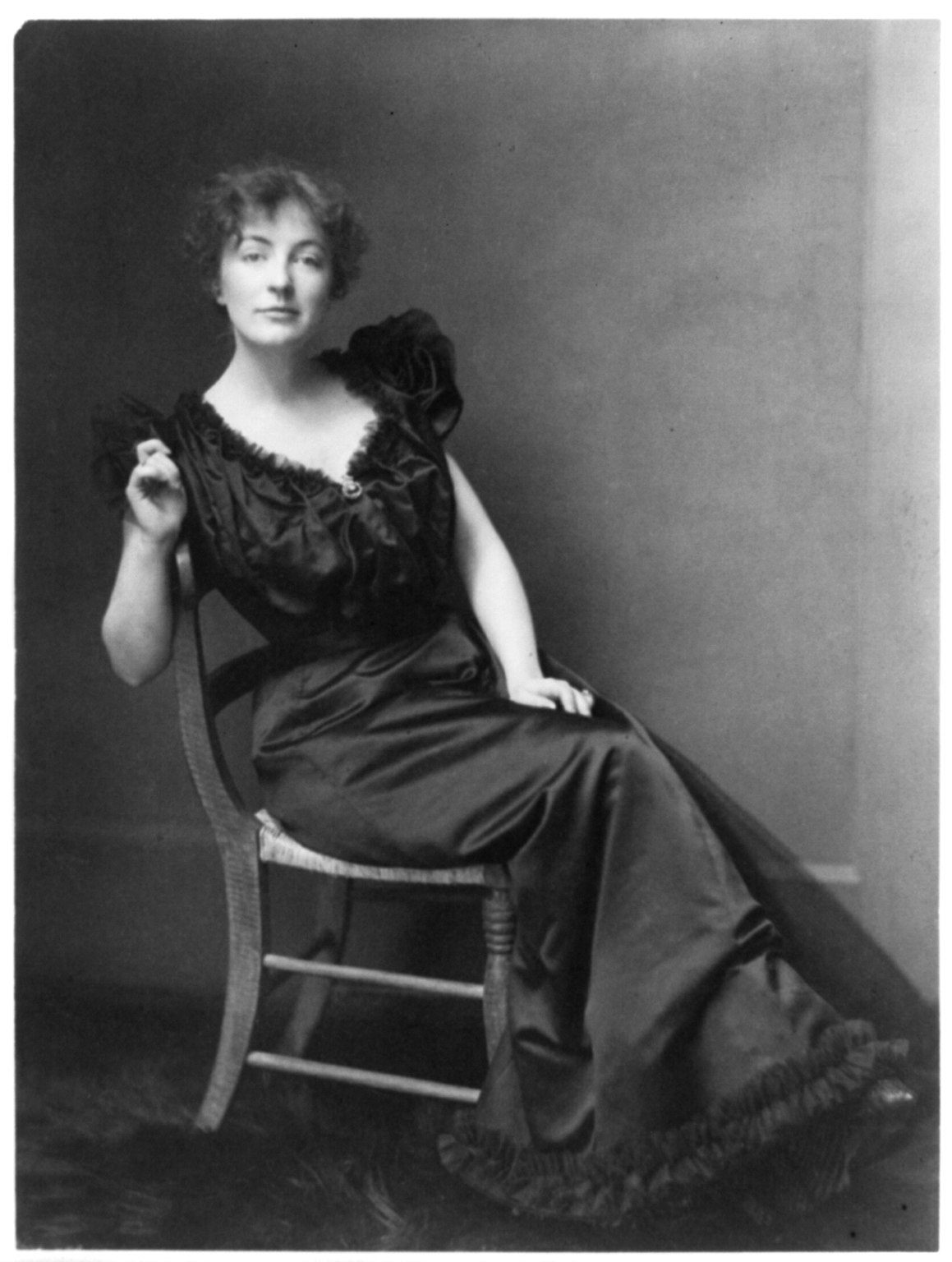
- Born: 1872; Washington, D.C., U.S.
- Died: June 5, 1951 (aged 78–79)
- Resting place: Rock Creek Cemetery; Washington, D.C., U.S.
- Spouse: Henry C. Hansbrough

Mary Berri Chapman Hansbrough (1872 – 5 June 1951) was an American poet and painter.

== Biography ==
She was born Mary Berri Chapman in Washington, D.C. to parents Charles Chapman of New Haven and Etta S. Chapman, a patent examiner. She was a member of the Art Students League of Washington. She wrote and illustrated her book Lyrics of Love and Nature, published in 1895. In 1897 she married the U.S. senator Henry C. Hansbrough. The same year, she published the work of fiction A Fashionable Hero in Harper's Magazine. In 1906 she published a 153 page volume titled Poems by MBCH.

She spent the last 42 years of her life, from 1909 to 1951, as a resident of St. Elizabeths Hospital, a mental health institution in Washington D.C. She was buried in Rock Creek Cemetery in Washington, DC.

== Collections ==
Her work is included in the collections of the Smithsonian American Art Museum and the Reading Public Museum, Reading, Pennsylvania.
