= Louis W. Dawson =

American lawyer (1896-1989)

Louis Welton Dawson (November 26, 1896 – December 17, 1989) was an American lawyer and insurance executive who served as president of the Mutual Life Insurance Company of New York.

== Early life ==
Dawson was born on November 26, 1896, in Boonton, New Jersey. He was a son of Nicholas Jacobus Dawson and Alice Louise (née Crevier) Dawson.

He attended Cornell University School of Law, where he graduated from in 1919 and served as Student Editor-in-Chief of The Cornell Law Quarterly. He had been awarded the Boardman scholarship for the year 1918-1919 and was elected to membership in the Order of the Coif.

== Career ==
Dawson was admitted to the New York bar in 1921 and became a partner of the Wall Street law firm, Powell, Lowrie & Ruch.

In 1928, Dawson began working in the law department of Mutual Life Insurance Company of New York before becoming vice president and general counsel in 1938. He was elected to the board of trustees in 1941. In September 1948, following the death of Alexander E. Patterson, Dawson took active charge of operations and was made executive vice president in January 1949, but was not elected president until March 1950. In September 1959, Roger Hull became president and chief executive officer while Dawson was elected to chairman of the board of trustees replacing Ambassador Lewis Williams Douglas. He retired as chairman of the board of trustees in December 1961. In 1967, Dawson retired as chairman of the company and was succeeded by Hull.

In 1953, he was elected president of the Life Insurance Association of America, succeeding Morton Boyd. Dawson also served as chairman of the Temporary Committee on the Taxation of Mutual Life Insurance Companies. In that capacity, he testified before the House of Representatives Subcommittee on Internal Revenue Taxation of the Committee on Ways and Means in Washington, D.C. in November 1958.

== Personal life ==
On July 16, 1936, Dawson was married to Elizabeth "Bobby" Byrne and lived in Ridgewood, New Jersey. With his first wife, Harriet Smith Dawson, Louis was the father of Charles Craig Dawson (1924–2009).

Dawson died on December 17, 1989, in Sarasota, Florida.
