= Little, Brown Book Group =

UK publisher founded in 1992

- Parent company: Hachette UK
- Predecessor: Macdonald and Futura
- Founded: 1992 (1938, Macdonald)
- Country of origin: United Kingdom
- Headquarters location: Victoria Embankment; London, EC4; United Kingdom
- Publication types: Books
- Official website: littlebrown.co.uk

Little, Brown Book Group is a UK publishing company created in 1988, with multiple predecessors. Since 2006 Little, Brown Book Group has been owned by Hachette UK, a subsidiary of Hachette Livre. It was acquired in 2006 from Time Warner of New York City, who then owned LBBG via the American publisher Little, Brown and Company.

Little, Brown has won the Publisher of the Year Award four times – in 1994, 2004, 2010 and 2014.

== History ==
Little and Brown was established in Boston, Massachusetts, United States, by Charles Little and James Brown in 1837; as Little, Brown and Company it was acquired by Time Inc in 1968. Little, Brown became part of the Time Warner Book Group when Time merged with Warner Communications in 1989. Still based in Boston, the Time Warner subsidiary Little, Brown purchased British publisher Macdonald from Maxwell Communication Corporation in 1992. The firm was renamed Little, Brown Book Group (Little, Brown offices moved to New York City in 2001.)

In 2014, Little, Brown acquired independent publisher Constable and Robinson, and soon merged Piatkus with the Constable and Robinson imprints to form Piatkus Constable Robinson (PCR). Another Constable and Robinson imprint, Corsair, publishes literary fiction and non-fiction separately from PCR.

In 2015, Ursula Doyle (formerly Associate Publisher of Virago) announced a new imprint, Fleet. Fleet's launch titles in 2016 included Charlotte Rogan's Now and Again, Melissa Fleming's A Hope More Powerful than the Sea, and the paperback edition of Virginia Baily's Early One Morning. The Fleet imprint's releases include Material Girls: Why Reality Matters for Feminism (2021) by Kathleen Stock, and Did Ye Hear Mammy Died? (2021) by Seamas O'Reilly.

== Imprints ==
Little, Brown Book Group publishes across the following imprints:

- Abacus
- Atom
- Blackfriars
- Constable
- Corsair
- Fleet
- Hachette Audio
- Little, Brown
- Orbit
- Piatkus
- Robinson
- Sphere
- Virago

== See also ==
- List of largest UK book publishers
- Virago Press
- Little, Brown and Company
