= Roger Hull =

Roger Hull may refer to:

- Roger Hull (insurance executive) (1907–1972), American insurance executive
- Roger Harold Hull (born 1942), American college president
