= James Attwood =

American businessman

James A. Attwood Jr.
- Other name: Jim Attwood
- Education: Harvard University (JD/MBA); Yale University(BA/MA)
- Occupation: Businessman
- Board member of: Syniverse
- Spouse: Leslie K. Williams
- Parent(s): James A. Attwood; Pauline

James Albert Attwood Jr. is an American businessman. He serves as a Senior Advisor at The Carlyle Group and chairman of Syniverse Technologies. He is a former investment banker at Goldman Sachs and EVP of Verizon Communications. He was a major donor to Hillary Clinton's 2016 presidential campaign and Joe Biden's 2020 presidential campaign.

== Early life and education ==
Attwood is the son of James A. Attwood, former chairman and chief executive of the Mutual Life Insurance Company of New York. and Pauline Attwood, former director of the Bronxville Adult School,

Attwood graduated summa cum laude from Yale University where he earned a BA in applied mathematics and an MA in statistics in 1980. He then attended Harvard University, and earned a J.D. from Harvard Law School and an M.B.A. from Harvard Business School in 1984.

== Career ==
Attwood started his career as an investment banker for Goldman Sachs, where he worked in New York and Tokyo for eleven years. He subsequently served as the Executive Vice President for Strategy, Development and Planning for Verizon Communications and GTE Corporation for four years. He joined The Carlyle Group in 2000, where he is now a Senior Advisor. Between 2000 and 2017 he directed Carlyle's private equity investments in the media and telecommunications industries globally, and between 2014 and 2017 he directed the firm's investments in the technology industry as well.

Attwood joined the board of directors of Nielsen Holdings in 2006 and was appointed its chairman in 2016. He stepped down in October 2022 when Nielsen was taken private. He also serves as chairman of the board of directors of Syniverse. He also served as an Independent Director at CoreSite Realty, and he formerly served as Co-Chair of Dex Media, and as director of Getty Images, Hawaiian Telcom and Insight Communications.

Attwood joined the Dean's Advisory Board for Harvard Law School in 2010. He currently serves as chair of the Caramoor Center for Music and the Arts in Katonah, New York and also Chairs the New York PBS station group WNET and Friends of MVY Radio, operator of the public radio station WMVY on Martha's Vineyard. Attwood also serves as a member of the Global Board of The Nature Conservancy.

=== Political activity ===
Attwood is a major donor to the Democratic Party, and donated to Correct the Record, a Super PAC which supported Hillary Clinton's 2016 presidential campaign. He also donated to Priorities USA Action, another pro-Hillary Clinton Super PAC, as well as to the Hillary Victory Fund and Hillary for America.

== Personal life ==
Attwood and his wife, Leslie Kim Williams, met at Harvard Law School, where they both graduated in the class of 1984. They have one daughter, Samantha Kim Attwood. They reside in Bedford Hills, New York, Martha's Vineyard, MA and Honolulu, HI.
