= James S. Bingay =

American insurance executive

James Sclater Bingay (October 10, 1919 – July 20, 1976) was an American insurance executive who served as president of the Mutual Life Insurance Company of New York.

== Early life ==
Bingay was born in Seattle, Washington on October 10, 1919. He was a son of Pierson Livingston Bingay of Yarmouth, Nova Scotia and Janet Gibson (née Sclater) Bingay. His brother was Woosley Bingay. His paternal grandparents were George Bingay (a descendant of John Bingay) and Susan Cornelia (née Stryker) Bingay (a sister of M. Woolsey Stryker, both grandchildren of Cmdr. Melancthon Taylor Woolsey). His maternal grandparents were Lt.-Col. James Sclater, DSO, and Mary Jane (née Sinclair) Sclater.

Bingay graduated from the University of Washington in 1942 before taking part in the management development program at Columbia University's Graduate School of Business in 1955 and the advanced management program at Harvard University's Graduate School of Business in 1960.

== Career ==
In 1945, after the end of World War II and his release from the U.S. Army with the rank of captain, Bingay joined Mutual Life Insurance Company of New York, where he ended up spending his entire career, as a field representative in Seattle. He became vice president of sales in December 1961 before being named senior vice president in 1963, executive vice president in 1967, and president and chief executive officer in 1972, the same year he also became a trustee. Upon his death in 1976, he was succeeded by James E. Devitt.

He was also active in industry‐wide organizations including the American Council of Life Insurance, where he served as director, and was a member of the executive committee of the American College. He was a director of the Carrier Corporation and Hart Schaffner Marx. Bingay served as chairman of the New York advisory board of the Salvation Army, a director for the United Fund of Greater New York and was a vice president, and member of the executive board, of the Greater New York Councils of the Boy Scouts of America.

== Personal life ==
In March 1942 Bingay was married to Margaret Blackstock, a daughter of Agnes and Nehemiah Blackstock. Together, James and Margaret were the parents of two children, a daughter and a son:

- Janis Lynn Bingay, who married Lee Martin Hague, a son of Richard Martin Hague, in 1968.
- James Sclater Bingay Jr., who married Margaret Jean Meyer, a daughter of Herbert Walter Meyer (president of Meyer, Lyra & Co., a South American exporter concern), in 1968.

He was a member of the Metropolitan Club, the Washington Athletic Club in Seattle and the Links in New York.

Bingay died of a heart attack at his home in Riverside, Connecticut on July 20, 1976. His funeral was held at St. Paul's Episcopal Church in Riverside.
