= James Farley (disambiguation) =

James Farley (1888–1976) was an American politician in New York.

James or Jim Farley may also refer to:

- James A. Farley Jr. (1928–1986), American sports commissioner
- James B. Farley (1930–2007), American business executive
- James C. Farley (1854–?), American photographer
- James I. Farley (1871–1948), American politician in Indiana
- James Lewis Farley (1823–1885), British orientalist
- James T. Farley (1829–1886), American politician in California
- James Farley (actor) (1882–1947), American actor
- James Farley (strikebreaker) (1874–1913), American detective and anti-union agency proprietor
- Jim Farley (businessman) (born 1962), American executive; presently the CEO of Ford

== See also ==
- James A. Farley Building, a historic landmark building named after the American politician
