= James Devitt =

James Devitt may refer to:

- James Devitt (politician) (1929–1989), American politician and businessman
- James E. Devitt (1920–1994), American lawyer and insurance executive
- Jim Devitt (1921–1988), Irish hurler
- Jamie Devitt (born 1990), Irish footballer
