= Robert Henry McCurdy =

American businessman

- Born: April 14, 1800; Lyme, Connecticut, U.S.
- Died: April 5, 1880 (aged 79)
- Resting place: Green-Wood Cemetery, Brooklyn, New York, U.S.
- Occupation: Businessman
- Political party: Whig Party
- Spouse: Gertrude Mercer Lee
- Children: 5, including Richard Aldrich McCurdy
- Parent(s): Richard McCurdy; Ursula Wolcott Griswold
- Relatives: Charles J. McCurdy (brother); Matthew Griswold (great-grandfather)

Robert Henry McCurdy (April 14, 1800 – April 5, 1880) was an American businessman and political candidate. He amassed great wealth with partner Herman D. Aldrich as the co-founder of McCurdy and Aldrich, a commission firm which traded Southern cotton and other dry goods prior to the Panic of 1857. He lost his bid for Congress as a Whig in the late 1850s, and served as Commissary-General for the State of New York during the American Civil War.

== Early life ==
Robert Henry McCurdy was born in 1800 in Lyme, Connecticut. He was the son of Ursula Wolcott (née Griswold) McCurdy and Richard McCurdy, a Yale graduate who served in the Connecticut House of Representatives. His older brother, Charles Johnson McCurdy (1797–1891), went on to serve as Lt. Governor of Connecticut as well as the United States Chargé to the Austrian Empire from 1850 to 1852.

He was of Scotch Irish descent on his paternal side; as early as 1503, King James VI leased the vast majority of the Isle of Bute to the MacKurerdy family (later McCurdy). His paternal grandfather, John McCurdy, emigrated to the United States from Ireland in 1745 prior to the Declaration of Independence. His mother's family was of English descent and his maternal great-grandfather, Matthew Griswold, served as the 17th Governor of Connecticut from 1784 to 1786.

== Career ==
In 1814, McCurdy moved to New York City and started working for Stephen Lockwood, a merchant. Shortly after, he was sent for work for Lockwood in Petersburg, Virginia, where he purchased cotton on commission. In 1820, along with Herman D. Aldrich, McCurdy co-founded McCurdy & Aldrich, a dry goods commission firm. It later became known as McCurdy, Aldrich and Spencer. They retired with great wealth prior to the Panic of 1857.

In 1857, McCurdy ran for the 35th United States Congress as a Whig, but he lost to Democratic politician John Cochrane. During the American Civil War, he was a staunch supporter of the Union, and he served as Commissary-General for the State of New York. Additionally, McCurdy made contributions to the Union Defense Committee of New York. It was also during the war that he became a founding member of the Union League Club of New York.

McCurdy was a co-founder of the Continental Fire Insurance Company. He was also a founding trustee of the Mutual Life Insurance Company. He also served on the board of directors of the Merchants Exchange Bank and the American Exchange National Bank.

== Personal life ==
McCurdy married Gertrude Mercer Lee (1809–1876), niece of Theodore Frelinghuysen, a United States Senator and former vice presidential candidate. Together, they were the parents of a number of children, including:

- Gertrude Mercer McCurdy (1827–1909), who married Gardiner Greene Hubbard (1822–1897), the first president of the Bell Telephone Company
- Theodore Frelinghuysen McCurdy (1829–1897), who married Carolyn Hubbard (1826–1868), sister of Gardiner. After her death, he married Anna Hubbard Gillette (1841–1927).
- Richard Aldrich McCurdy (1835–1916), who married Sarah Ellen Little (b. 1835), the daughter of publisher Charles Coffin Little.
- Sarah Lord McCurdy (1842–1914), who married Dr. Elias Joseph Marsh (1838–1908), a Columbia University graduate.
- Roberta Wolcott McCurdy (1845–1920), who married Charles Mercer Marsh, Esq. (1841–1902), who practiced law with Benjamin T. Kissam.

McCurdy died on April 5, 1880. His funeral was held as a joint ceremony with Herman D. Aldrich, who died on the same day, at the Calvary Church. The funeral was attended by Peter Cooper, William E. Dodge, Frederick Theodore Frelinghuysen, James Watson Webb, Thurlow Weed, etc. His sermon was given by George L. Prentiss, a Presbyterian pastor of the Union Theological Seminary. He was buried at the Green-Wood Cemetery next to Aldrich.

McCurdy's portrait was commissioned by the Chamber of Commerce of the State of New York in 1886.

=== Descendants ===
Through his daughter Gertrude, he was the grandfather of Mabel Gardiner Hubbard (1859–1923), who married inventor Alexander Graham Bell, the son of Alexander Melville Bell, and Roberta Wolcott Hubbard (1859–1885), who married businessman Charles James Bell, the son of David Charles Bell and a cousin of Alexander Graham Bell.

Through his son Richard, he was the grandfather of Harvard graduate Robert Henry McCurdy (b. 1859), who married Mary Suckley in 1898, and Gertrude Lee McCurdy (d. 1930), who married sportsman and philanthropist Louis A. Thebaud (1859–1939).
