= Michael I. Roth =

American business executive

Michael Isor Roth (born 1946), an American accountant and lawyer who served as the former chairman and chief executive of the Interpublic Group of Companies and the Mutual Life Insurance Company of New York.

== Early life ==
Roth grew up in Brooklyn where his father was a lawyer and his mother was a bookkeeper. Roth received an undergraduate degree in accounting from the City College of New York after received his Juris Doctor from Boston University Law School and a masters of law from New York University Law School.

== Career ==
A certified public accountant and lawyer, he began working for the accounting firm Coopers & Lybrand (today known as PricewaterhouseCoopers) after leaving school. After making partner there at age 30, he later joined the American Can Company, which became Primerica Corporation, a financial services company with some insurance operations where he was an executive vice president and chief financial officer. He left when the company was sold to Sanford Weill's Commercial Credit in 1988.

=== MONY ===
In 1988, Roth joined the Mutual Life Insurance Company of New York as chief financial officer. In 1990, he was named president and chief operating officer succeeding James B. Farley, who continued as chairman and chief executive. In September 2003, AXA Financial, Inc. announced a takeover offer of $1.5 billion for MONY Group of New York, which Roth supported but some of its largest shareholder's, including Highfields Capital Management, Third Avenue Management, Southeastern Asset Management and Advisory Research, immediately objected to as being too low. The offer was accepted by shareholders in May 2004, and on July 8, 2004, MONY became a wholly owned subsidiaries of European insurer, allowing AXA to become "the fourth-largest seller of variable annuities in the United States and the largest seller of variable life insurance."

As part of the takeover, Roth stood "to receive as much as $23.3 million, including payments for vested stock options". Additionally, Mony's president and CEO, Samuel J. Foti (who joined the company in 1988 from the Metropolitan Life Insurance Company), may get as much as $16.4 million; the chief investment officer, Kenneth M. Levine (who joined MONY in 1972), as much as $12.7 million; and the chief financial officer, Richard Daddario, as much as $9.13 million.

=== Interpublic ===
In January 2005, Roth became chief executive officer and co-chairman of the Interpublic Group of Companies (IPG) in New York, succeeding David A. Bell. Roth had previously joined the Interpubic board in February 2002. Notably, "Interpublic had to restate earnings downward by $181.3 million, because of accounting irregularities that first emerged in August 2002." Upon Bell's retirement in 2006, he became sole chairman. In October 2020, IPG announced that Phillippe Krakowsky would be succeeding Roth as the company's CEO on January 1, 2021. Roth retired from the company and the Board of Directors on December 31, 2021.

Today, he serves as chairman of the technology company Pitney Bowes, where he has been a director since 1995.

== Personal life ==
Roth lives with his wife in Pound Ridge, New York. They are the parents of Andrew Evan Roth, a lawyer who married Sarra Jill Cooper, a daughter of Dr. Robert A. Cooper, in 2006.
