= Alexander E. Patterson =

American businessman

Alexander Evans Patterson (June 23, 1887 – September 10, 1948) was an American insurance executive who served as president of the Mutual Life Insurance Company of New York. He was the grandson of U.S. Senator John J. Patterson.

== Early life ==
Patterson was born in Washington, D.C., on June 23, 1887. He was a son of attorney William H. Patterson (1856–1908) and Georgie Anna (née Evans) Patterson (1856–1923), who later moved to Battle Creek, Michigan, and his elder brother was William Hart Patterson, a "pioneer in the development of high-speed electric elevators and perfection of automatic control for elevators." His paternal grandparents were U.S. Senator John James Patterson and Lucretia (née Moore) Patterson.

He graduated from the University of Pittsburgh.

== Career ==
Patterson began his career at the Equitable Life Assurance Society of Pittsburgh. During World War I, he served overseas as a major in the field infantry with the 79th Division. After the War, he returned to the Pittsburgh office of Equitable before being transferred to New YOrk City in 1922 to establish a new agency there. In 1925 he moved to Chicago to lead Equitable's largest agency there. In 1928 he joined Penn Mutual Life Insurance Company as general agent for Chicago and the State of Illinois. In 1937 he was made vice president of Penn Mutual.

He joined the Mutual Life Insurance Company of New York in 1941, resigning as vice president of Penn Mutual of Philadelphia. He was made executive vice president in January 1942 and was elected to the board of trustees of Mutual Life in February 1942. In 1947, Patterson was elected president of Mutual Life to succeed Lewis Williams Douglas, who had been appointed as the United States Ambassador to the United Kingdom by President Harry S. Truman. While president, he initiated the construction of the Mutual of New York Building at 1740 Broadway, which was completed in 1950 after his death.

Patterson served four years as an officer and trustee of the National Association of Life Underwriters before being elected vice president and then president in 1936. IN 1939 he was named chairman of the Association of Life Agency Officers. He also served as a trustee of Roosevelt Hospital in New York, a director of the New York chapter of the American Red Cross and was a national trustee of the Sigma Alpha Epsilon fraternity.

== Personal life ==
In 1920, Patterson was married to Eleanor Morgan (1895–1999), a daughter of Henry G. Morgan and Rhoda (née Price) Morgan. Together, they lived at 455 East 57th Street in Manhattan and had a summer home in Bucks County, Pennsylvania. Together, they were the parents of two children, Alexander E. Patterson Jr. and Portia Coxe Patterson (who married Robert H. Westerfield).

Patterson died of heart attack in East Orange, New Jersey while visiting his grandnephew, Rolon Reed, a patient in East Orange General Hospital on September 10, 1948. His funeral was held at St. James' Episcopal Church in Manhattan.
