= Richard Aldrich McCurdy =

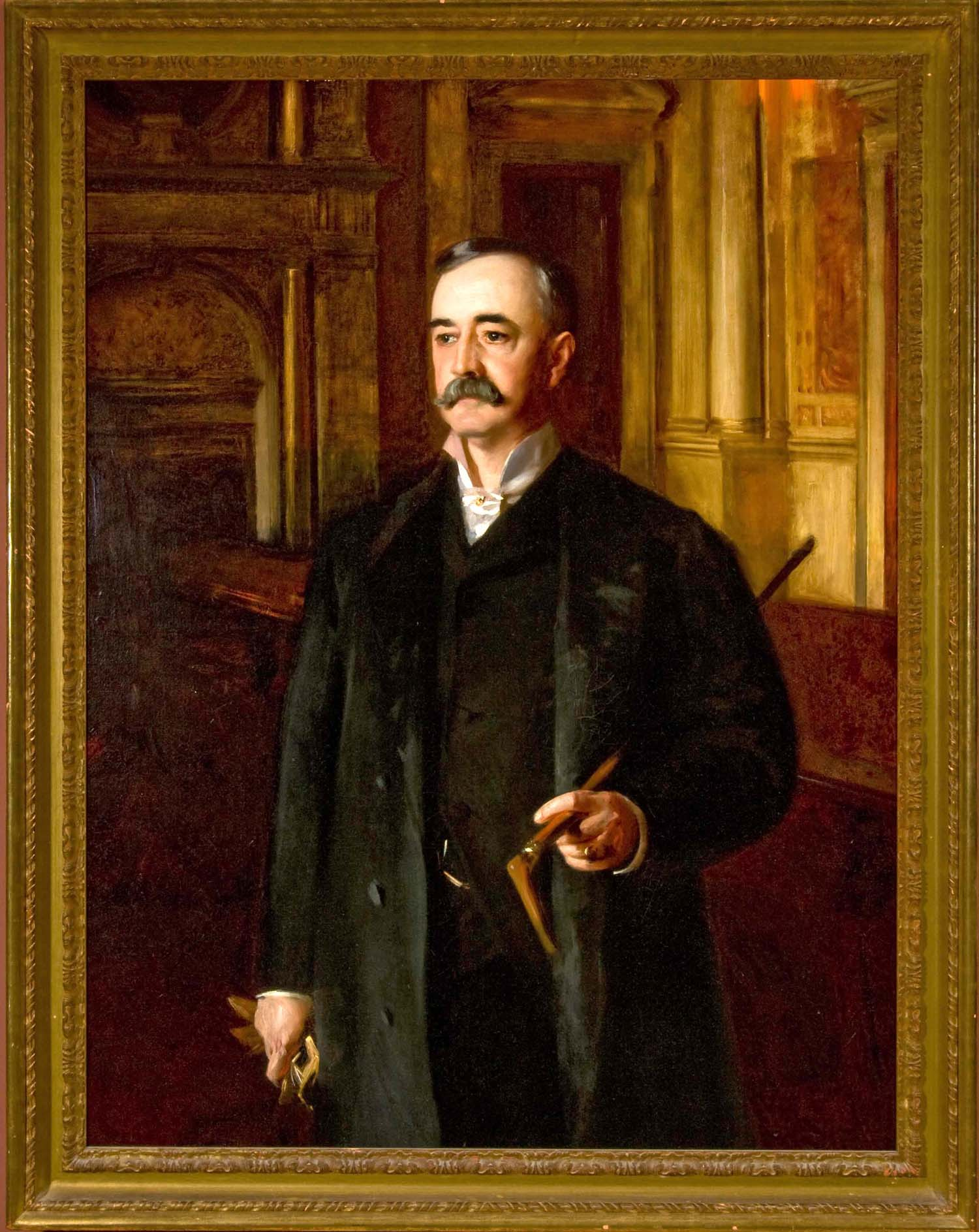
- portrait by John Singer Sargent, 1890
- Born: January 29, 1835; New York City, U.S.
- Died: March 6, 1916 (aged 81); Morristown, New Jersey, U.S.
- Education: Harvard Law School
- Occupations: Attorney, business executive, banker
- Spouse: Sarah Ellen Little
- Children: Robert H. Curdy
- Parent(s): Robert Henry McCurdy; Gertrude Mercer Lee
- Relatives: Theodore Frelinghuysen (maternal great-uncle); Charles J. McCurdy (paternal uncle); Charles Coffin Little (father-in-law); Gardiner Greene Hubbard (brother-in-law)

Richard Aldrich McCurdy (January 29, 1835, New York City – March 6, 1916, Morristown, New Jersey) was an American attorney, business executive and banker during the Gilded Age. He served as the President of the Mutual Life Insurance Company from 1885 to 1906, when he retired in the wake of a corporate scandal.

== Early life ==
Richard Aldrich McCurdy was born on January 29, 1835, in New York City. His father, Robert Henry McCurdy, was a prominent New York City businessman. His mother, Gertrude Mercer Lee, was the niece of Theodore Frelinghuysen, a United States Senator and former vice presidential candidate.

McCurdy was of Scotch Irish descent on his paternal side; as early as 1503, King James VI leased the vast majority of the Isle of Bute to the MacKurerdy family (later McCurdy). His paternal great-grandfather, John McCurdy, emigrated to the United States from Ireland prior to the Declaration of Independence. His paternal uncle, Charles J. McCurdy, served as the United States Chargé to the Austrian Empire from 1850 to 1852.

McCurdy received a law degree from the Harvard Law School in 1856.

== Career ==
McCurdy was practised law with William Betts Jr., and Lucius Robinson, who served as the 26th Governor of New York from 1877 to 1879.

McCurdy became legal counsel to the Mutual Life Insurance Company from 1860 to 1865. He became its vice president in 1865. He served as its President from 1885 to 1906. Under his leadership, the Mutual Life Insurance Company Building was built in Manhattan; according to John N. Ingham, "it was at that time the largest office structure in the world." Moreover, "the assets of Mutual Life grew from $103,627,812 to $476,861,165" from 1883 to 1903. However, McCurdy and other Mutual Life executives were accused of misappropriation of the company assets. By 1905, McCurdy was questioned over the salary his son received from the company. He retired in this midst of the scandal, in 1906.

When the newly formed Mutual Alliance Trust Company opened for business in New York on the Tuesday after June 29, 1902, there were 13 directors, including Emanuel Lehman, William Rockefeller, Cornelius Vanderbilt, and McCurdy.

Additionally, McCurdy served as the President of the Bell Telephone Company. He also served as vice president and director of the Western National Bank of the United States in New York. Moreover, he served on the board of directors of the United States Mortgage & Trust Company.

== Personal life ==
McCurdy married Sarah Ellen Little, daughter of Charles Coffin Little, on 22 October 1856. They had two children, Robert H. McCurdy (who married Mary Suckley), and Gertrude Lee McCurdy (who married Louis A. Thebaud). They resided on lower Fifth Avenue in Manhattan, New York City, until they moved to a mansion Morris Plains, New Jersey, followed by another mansion in Morristown, New Jersey.

McCurdy's sister Gertrude married Gardiner Greene Hubbard, the first president of the Bell Telephone Company and a founder of the National Geographic Society. McCurdy was thus the uncle of their daughter, Mabel Gardiner Hubbard, who married Alexander Graham Bell.

McCurdy was a member of the Metropolitan Club, the Union League Club of New York, the Manhattan Club, the Manhattan Club (social club) and the Lawyer's Club. He was also a member of the New England Society of New York and the American Museum of Natural History.

== Death ==
McCurdy died on March 6, 1916, in Morristown, New Jersey. He was eighty-one years old. His portrait, painted by John Singer Sargent in 1890, is in the collection of the Charles Hosmer Morse Museum of American Art in Winter Park, Florida. His photograph, taken by Ira W. Martin in 1890, is in the collection of the Frick Collection on the Upper East Side of New York City.
