= Little, Brown and Company =

American book publisher founded in 1837

- Parent company: Hachette Book Group USA
- Founded: 1837; 189 years ago
- Founder: Charles Coffin Little; James Brown
- Country of origin: United States
- Headquarters location: Boston (1837 to 2001) and New York City (2001 to present), U.S.
- Imprints: Back Bay Books; Mulholland Books; Jimmy Patterson Books; Little, Brown Spark; Voracious
- Official website: www.littlebrown.com

Little, Brown and Company is an American publishing company founded in 1837 by Charles Coffin Little and James Brown in Boston. It publishes works by American authors. Early lists featured Emily Dickinson's poetry and Bartlett's Familiar Quotations. Since 2006, Little, Brown and Company is a division of the Hachette Book Group.

== History ==
=== 19th century ===
Little, Brown and Company had its roots in the book selling trade. It was founded in 1837 in Boston by Charles Little and James Brown. They formed the partnership "for the purpose of Publishing, Importing, and Selling Books". It can trace its roots before that to 1784 to a bookshop owned by Ebenezer Battelle on Marlborough Street. They published works of Benjamin Franklin and George Washington, and specialized in legal publishing and importing titles.

The company was the most extensive law publisher in the United States, and also the largest importer of standard English law and miscellaneous works, introducing American buyers to the Encyclopædia Britannica, the dictionaries of William Smith, and many other standard works. In the early years Little and Brown published the Works of Daniel Webster, George Bancroft's History of the United States, William H. Prescott's Ferdinand and Isabella, Jones Very's first book of poetry (edited by Ralph Waldo Emerson), Letters of John Adams and works by James Russell Lowell and Francis Parkman. Little, Brown and Company was the American publisher for Edward Gibbon's The Decline and Fall of the Roman Empire.

The firm was the original publisher of United States Statutes at Large beginning in 1845, under authority granted by a joint resolution of Congress. In 1874, Congress transferred the authority to publish the Statutes at Large to the Government Printing Office, which has been responsible for producing the set since that time. 1 U.S.C. § 113 still recognizes their edition of the laws and treaties of the United States are competent evidence of the several public and private Acts of Congress, treaties, and international agreements other than treaties of the United States.

In 1853, Little, Brown began publishing the works of British poets from Chaucer to Wordsworth. Ninety-six volumes were published in the series in five years.

In 1859, John Bartlett became a partner in the firm. He held the rights to his Familiar Quotations, and Little, Brown published the 15th edition of the work in 1980, 125 years after its first publication. John Murray Brown, James Brown's son, took over when Augustus Flagg retired in 1884. In the 1890s, Little, Brown expanded into general publishing, including fiction. In 1896, it published Quo Vadis. In 1898, Little, Brown purchased a list of titles from the Roberts Brothers firm. 19th century employees included Charles Carroll Soule.

=== 20th century ===
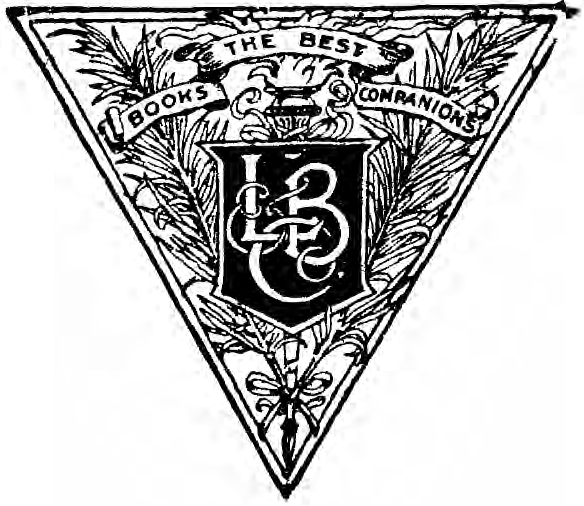
Little, Brown and Company's insignia used in 1906

John Murray Brown died in 1908 and James W. McIntyre became managing partner. When McIntyre died in 1913, Little, Brown incorporated. In 1925, Little, Brown entered into an agreement to publish all Atlantic Monthly books. This arrangement lasted until 1985. During this time the joint Atlantic Monthly Press/Little Brown imprint published All Quiet on the Western Front, Hergé's The Adventures of Tintin, James Truslow Adams's The Adams Family, Charles Nordhoff and James Norman Hall's Mutiny on the Bounty and its sequels, James Hilton's Goodbye, Mr. Chips, Walter D. Edmonds's Drums Along the Mohawk, William Least Heat-Moon's Blue Highways, Tracy Kidder's The Soul of a New Machine, J. D. Salinger's The Catcher in the Rye and James G. Randall's The Divided Union.

Salinger later terminated his contract with the publishing house sometime in the 1970s, though his novel was still published by Little, Brown.

Other prominent figures published by Little, Brown in the 20th and early 21st centuries have included Nagaru Tanigawa, Donald Barthelme, Louisa M. Alcott, Catherine Drinker Bowen, Bernie Brillstein, Thornton Burgess, Hortense Calisher, Bruce Catton, A. J. Cronin, Peter De Vries, J. Frank Dobie, C. S. Forester, John Fowles, Malcolm Gladwell, Pete Hamill, Cynthia Harrod-Eagles, Lillian Hellman, Oliver Wendell Holmes Sr., Henry Kissinger, Elizabeth Kostova, Norman Mailer, William Manchester, Nelson Mandela, John P. Marquand, Masters and Johnson, Stephenie Meyer, Rick Moody, Ogden Nash, Edwin O'Connor, Erich Maria Remarque, Alice Sebold, David Sedaris, George Stephanopoulos, Gwyn Thomas, Gore Vidal, David Foster Wallace, Evelyn Waugh, John A. Williams, P. G. Wodehouse, James Patterson and Herman Wouk. Little, Brown also published the photography of Ansel Adams.

The company was purchased by Time Inc. in 1968. Little, Brown acquired the medical publisher College Hill Press in 1986. Little, Brown was made part of the Time Warner Book Group when Time merged with Warner Communications to form Time Warner in 1989. In 2001, all editing staff moved from Boston to Time Warner Book Group offices in New York City.

=== 21st century ===
In 2001, Michael Pietsch became publisher of Little, Brown.

Little, Brown expanded into the United Kingdom in 1992 when TWBG bought MacDonald & Co from Maxwell Communications, taking on its Abacus (upmarket paperback) and Orbit (science fiction) lists, and authors including Iain Banks. Feminist publisher Virago Press followed in 1996. Also in 1996, Wolters Kluwer acquired Little, Brown's legal and medical publishing division and incorporated it into its Aspen and Lippincott-Raven imprints.

In 2006, the Time Warner Book Group was sold to French publisher Hachette Livre. Following this, the Little, Brown imprint is used by Hachette Livre's U.S. publishing company, Hachette Book Group.

In 2011, Little, Brown launched an imprint devoted to suspense publishing: Mulholland Books.

In February 2013, after Pietsch had risen to CEO of Hachette Book Group, Reagan Arthur was selected to be publisher of Little, Brown, while closing her five-year-old imprint, Reagan Arthur Books.

In October 2017, Little, Brown started an unnamed imprint devoted to health, lifestyle, psychology, and science with the appointment of Tracy Behar as the imprint's vice president, publisher, and editor-in-chief. The imprint Little, Brown Spark launched in fall 2018 and has published authors such as Mark Hyman, Tricia Hersey, and Sue Johnson.

In October 2018, Little, Brown announced an imprint dedicated to illustrated books with Michael Szczerban as vice president and editorial director. The Voracious imprint launched in fall 2019 and has published works by Accidentally Wes Anderson, Ayesha Curry, Vivian Howard, Christopher Kimball's Milk Street, Marcus Samuelsson, and Pete Souza, among others.

In February 2020, Hachette Book Group acquired 1,000 titles for young readers from Disney Book Group for Little, Brown Books for Young Readers.

In May 2020, Bruce Nichols became publisher of Little, Brown's adult imprints.

In 2022, Little, Brown launched an imprint for graphic novels named Little, Brown Ink.

In March 2024, Sally Kim succeeded Nichols as publisher, joining Little, Brown from G.P. Putnam's Sons.

== See also ==
- Badminton Library
- Books in the United States
- List of largest UK book publishers
- Little, Brown Book Group
