= Mutual Life Insurance Co. of New York v. Hillmon =

- Supreme Court of the United States

Decided May 16, 1892
- Full case name: Mutual Life Insurance Company of New York v. Hillmon, No. 182; New York Life Insurance Company v. Hillmon, No. 183; Connecticut Mutual Life Insurance Company of Hartford, Connecticut v. Hillmon, No. 184
- Citations: 145 U.S. 285 (more) 12 S. Ct. 909; 36 L. Ed. 706

Case history
- Prior: C.C.D. Kan.

Holding
- (1) The three consolidated defendants should have received three peremptory challenges each, rather than three jointly (2) Walter's letter, though hearsay and not a business record, should have been admitted as a statement of intent

Court membership
- Chief Justice Melville Fuller Associate Justices Stephen J. Field · John M. Harlan; Horace Gray · Samuel Blatchford; Lucius Q. C. Lamar II · David J. Brewer; Henry B. Brown

Case opinion
- Majority: Gray, joined by unanimous

Laws applied
- 28 U.S.C. § 734

Mutual Life Insurance Co. of New York v. Hillmon, 145 U.S. 285 (1892), is a landmark U.S. Supreme Court case that created one of the most important rules of evidence in American and British courtrooms: an exception to the hearsay rule for statements regarding the intentions of the declarant. Decided in 1892, the Hillmon case was authored by Justice Horace Gray, and its holding has been codified in Federal Rule of Evidence 803(3), and adopted by many other jurisdictions.

== Background ==
The Hillmon lawsuit concerned the enforcement of a life insurance contract and the identity of a man who died of a gunshot wound near Medicine Lodge, Kansas. Sallie Hillmon - a young woman from Lawrence, Kansas - claimed that in late 1879, her husband John had been killed by a firearm accident at a desolate Kansas campsite called Crooked Creek. The three insurance companies issuing a $25,000 policy on John Hillmon's life maintained that he was still alive. In support of their contention that Hillmon was still alive, the insurance companies offered a letter purportedly written on March 1, 1879, by Frederick Walters, a young cigarmaker. In his letter written to his sweetheart, Walters describes meeting "a man named Hillmon" who invited him to travel with him out west to start a sheep ranch. Upon the insurance companies' refusal to issue the $25,000 policy to Ms. Hillmon, she sued the companies for the policy proceeds. The first two Hillmon trials, in 1882 and 1885, produced hung juries. However, the third resulted in a victory for Sallie Hillmon. It was this 1888 verdict that led to the famous Supreme Court decision of 1892 reversing the judgment in her favor. Nevertheless, three more trials ensued, two ending with hung juries and the last in another verdict for Sallie Hillmon, which was once again overturned by the Supreme Court. The ultimate contested factual issue in all of the trials was the identity of a man whose death far predated the availability of twentieth-century methods of identification. After repeated hung juries in the first two trials, the Supreme Court found that Walters' letter should have been admitted into evidence. With this ruling, the Court created an entirely new exception to the hearsay rule for out-of-court statements describing the intentions of a declarant and remanded the decision to the trial court. More than a decade later, the trial court produced a verdict for Ms. Hillmon.

On May 19, 2006—115 years after the Supreme Court's ruling—Professor Marianne Wesson of the University of Colorado Law School, anthropologist Dennis Van Gervenof the University of Colorado at Boulder, and University of Colorado graduate students in anthropology exhumed the corpse in the presence of Hillmon family members and a film crew to try to scientifically determine the corpse's identity. Although the DNA results from the bones discovered by the team were inconclusive, scientific analysis of photographic comparisons of the corpse, Hillmon, and Walters indicated that the disputed corpse was more likely Hillmon than Walters.

=== John Hillmon ===
John Wesley Hillmon, a Civil War veteran, was born in 1848 in Indiana. In the late 1860s, he moved with his family to a Kansas township called Grasshopper Springs. In October 1878, Hillmon, thirty years old, married a young waitress named Sallie Quinn. Thereafter, the couple set up housekeeping in Lawrence, Kansas. Hillmon, an industrious man, had worked as a foreman, miner, brick maker, cowboy, ranch hand, buffalo hunter, and occasional buffalo hide dealer in Kansas, Colorado, and Texas. Despite his many occupations, he had never made much money. Accordingly, a few weeks after his wedding, Hillmon set off on a journey west with his old friend and working partner John Brown. Hillmon told Sallie that he intended to find some land where they could start a ranch of their own.

Before leaving home, Hillmon purchased $25,000 of life insurance (which would be nearly $500,000 in current dollars) with the help of his wife's cousin, Levi Baldwin. The amount of insurance was so large for a man of ordinary means to carry that Hillmon had to go to three different insurance companies to procure four policies totaling $25,000 (one for $10,000 and three for $5,000).

In December 1878, Hillmon and Brown set out west for their journey. They traveled as far as the southwest Kansas town of Medicine Lodge before cold weather eventually drove them back to Wichita together, and then Hillmon back to Lawrence, Kansas. In late February 1879, Hillmon set off again, meeting up with Brown in Wichita and traveling to Crooked Creek on the night of March 16, 1879. The next evening, John Brown reported to a neighbor named Philip Briley that Hillmon had been shot dead at their campsite. The neighbor called the nearest coroner, George Paddock, who inspected the scene of the death and convened an inquest. On March 18, 1879, John Brown testified that he had accidentally shot and killed Hillmon when the rifle he was unloading from their wagon discharged, shooting Hillmon in the head. The corpse was dressed in John Hillmon's clothes and boots. At the inquest, witnesses from Medicine Lodge who had been in the company of Brown and Hillmon testified that the corpse was the man they had known as Hillmon. Most of them remembered Hillmon because he had passed through their town on the earlier trip. On April 10, 1879, the Medicine Lodge inquest returned a verdict of death by misadventure, or accidental death.

Once the body was buried in Medicine Lodge, Sallie requested payment of the life insurance proceeds from the three companies that had issued the policies. Suspicious, the insurance companies began to investigate the Hillmon claim. At this time, life insurance fraud was not uncommon — there had been several cases in which people had bought large amounts of insurance, killed someone, and disguised the corpse as the policy holder, who would be somewhere in hiding. (In fact, when the Hillmon case reached the Supreme Court, one of the Justices would refer to the case as one of “graveyard insurance,” meaning fraud.) Believing they were being swindled, the companies dispatched their agents to Medicine Lodge immediately.

The agents insisted that the body be disinterred and returned to Lawrence, after which it was delivered to an undertaking establishment and inspected by dozens of persons who had known John Hillmon in life. The Douglas County coroner convened another inquest. Although performed by the state-employed Douglas County coroner, the County Attorney, and in the presence of Douglas County jurors, this inquest (which the coroner much later admitted) was wholly funded by the insurance companies, who paid all the involved parties. The chief controversies at this inquest were the differences between the corpse's and Hillmon's height and teeth, in addition to the smallpox vaccination scar that the corpse carried on its shoulder. Sallie Quinn Hillmon and her cousin Levi Baldwin testified that the body belonged to John Hillmon, as did a few other acquaintances. Other witnesses testified emphatically that it was not and could not have been Hillmon. The corpse was five feet, eleven inches tall; some said it could not be Hillmon because Hillmon was at least two inches shorter, but others said he was exactly that height. Witnesses testified that Hillmon had one or more rotten teeth, while the corpse's teeth were excellent. But some witnesses testified that Hillmon too had fine teeth. Moreover, the corpse had a smallpox vaccination scar exactly where Hillmon had been vaccinated, but some of the insurance company doctors said that the scar on the corpse's arm was too fresh to be from the vaccination that Hillmon had received some weeks prior. Ultimately, this inquest, unlike the Medicine Lodge inquest, returned a finding that the death was of a “person unknown,” and had been caused “feloniously by J.H. Brown.”

=== Sallie Hillmon ===
Sallie Hillmon, John Hillmon's wife, was a waitress from Lawrence, Kansas. Sallie Hillmon claimed that, in 1879, her husband John had been killed by a firearm accident at a desolate Kansas campsite called Crooked Creek. It became clear to Sallie that the insurance companies were not going to pay, so she filed suit in 1880. Her case went to trial in 1882; it would eventually be tried six times. The Hillmon litigation lasted for almost 25 years, and would be argued in front of the Supreme Court twice. The first two trials, in 1882 and 1885, both produced hung juries. The third trial produced a verdict for Sallie Hillmon, possibly because of the trial judge's exclusion of the insurance companies’ most important piece of evidence: the “Dearest Alvina” letter.

Even with the Dearest Alvina letter in evidence, the fourth trial of 1895 and the fifth trial of 1896 ended in hung juries. In the sixth trial matters became even more interesting with the testimony of a Leavenworth cigar factory owner, Arthur Simmons. Simmons testified that he had employed an F. Walters at his cigar making shop two months after Frederick Adolph Walters’ alleged death at Crooked Creek. He produced employment records and identified a picture of Frederick A. Walters as the Walters who was formerly in his employ. This evidence was persuasive to the jury and they returned a unanimous verdict for Sallie Hillmon. The insurance companies managed in 1903 to persuade the Supreme Court again to overturn Sallie Hillmon's victory, on less memorable evidentiary grounds. But eventually all of the insurance companies settled with Sallie, for the full face amount of the policies plus accumulated interest.

=== Frederick Walters ===
The crux of the insurance company's case was a letter headed "Wichita, Kansas, March 1, 1879" and beginning "Dearest Alvina." It appeared to be from Frederick Adolph Walters to his fiancée, Miss Alvina Kasten. Walters and Kasten had been sweethearts in Fort Madison Iowa, but Walters had left his Iowa home in the spring of the previous year to pursue his trade as an itinerant cigarmaker. Alvina Katsen, in a pretrial deposition, swore that she had received this letter from the post office early in March 1879. In the letter, Walters wrote that he planned to leave Wichita “with a certain Mr. Hillmon, a sheep-trader, for Colorado or parts unknown to me.” It was this intention to travel with Mr. Hillmon that was crucial to the 1892 decision. According to Alivina Kasten and members of the Walters family, this was the last correspondence any of them received from Frederick, and they had not seen him since.

Judge Oliver Perry Shiras, presiding in the third trial of the Hillmon case, had excluded this letter from the jury's knowledge, agreeing with Sallie Hillmon's lawyers that it was hearsay. (Her lawyers apparently had not thought to make this objection in the first two trials.) The letter certainly was hearsay according to the usual definition: an out of court statement offered in court to prove the truth of the matter asserted. There were certain recognized exceptions to the hearsay rule, but the Dearest Alvina letter did not seem to qualify for any of them. The insurance companies’ lawyers could do no better than to argue that it was a business record; there was such an exception to the hearsay rule, but a love letter certainly did not satisfy its requirements.

=== John Brown ===
John Brown was John Hillmon's traveling companion. After John Brown reported the shooting death at Crooked Creek to some nearby rural residents, two inquests were conducted under the auspices of the coroner at Medicine Lodge, seat of Barbour County. The first coroner's jury failed to agree whether the death was accident or otherwise (one account says the jury “did not know how to render a verdict,” an odd circumstance suggesting that homicide, or at least investigations into it, were not common in Barbour County); the second concluded that the shooting was accidental. The body was then buried at Medicine Lodge, and Brown wrote a letter to Sallie Hillmon explaining what had happened and conveying his regret and condolences.

In each of the inquests, Brown told the same story of an accidental shooting. However, after the Douglas County inquest's finding, Brown went to stay at his brother's home to Missouri, and soon afterward his story changed. Over the summer of 1879, Brown was approached several times by an attorney who claimed he had been hired by Brown's father to represent the son and protect him from the consequences of the second inquest verdict. But the attorney, J.R. Buchan, was really retained by the insurance companies. It is undisputed that Brown then signed an affidavit prepared by Buchan that was wholly inconsistent with his previous tale. Brown's new story stated that he and Hillmon had picked up a traveler called Joe, whose last name sounded like Burgess or Berkley. This traveler, according to the affidavit, was naïve and agreed to travel unseen, hiding at times under the blanket in the wagon so people would only note two men traveling together. The document went on to say that “Joe” was chosen because he was a passable lookalike for Hillmon, and that Hillmon had inoculated the intended victim by using a pocket knife and serum from Hillmon's own vaccination site.

Brown's affidavit stated that it was Hillmon who murdered the Joe Burgess/Berkley and switched clothes with the victim, as well as planting his own journal in the victim's inside jacket pocket. The affidavit also described a conversation Brown had with Sallie, in which she said she knew of Hillmon's whereabouts and that he was not dead. After Buchan showed this affidavit to Mrs. Hillmon, in an unsuccessful effort to persuade her to withdraw her insurance claims, Brown tore up it up and threw it in the stove. (Buchan retrieved it and repaired it for use in court later, making clear that his real client was the insurance companies.) Later, Brown further repudiated this statement, and he testified in 1882 that he had only signed the affidavit because Buchan had told him he would be arrested and convicted of murder if he refused.

== The Supreme Court Opinion ==
After losing the third trial to Sallie Hillmon, the companies pursued an appeal to the United States Supreme Court. That Court overturned the jury's verdict for Sallie, ruling that declarations of intention are ‘credible evidence’ of said intention, and that such statements of intention are thus admissible as exceptions to the hearsay rule. The Court held that often such evidence is "indispensable to the due administration of justice" and the truth of such evidence is an evidentiary issue to be decided by the jury. This decision was quite novel, for there was very little authority for the proposition that statements of intention qualified as an exception to the hearsay rule. Most hearsay exceptions (then and now) rest on the belief that certain kinds of statements are unlikely to be false even if made without benefit of oath and cross-examination. It was Walters’ expressed intention to go traveling with Hillmon that was dispositive of the Court's 1892 opinion. The Court held that the declarations in the letters tended to prove Walters’ “intention of going, and going with Hillmon,” which would make it more plausible that Walters’ “did go and that he went with Hillmon,” which in turn would increase the likelihood that the corpse and murder victim was Walters. The Court concluded that admissibility of Frederick Adolph Walters’ letters could contribute to the circumstantial case presented by the defendants and “might properly influence the jury.”

== Modern Investigation ==
In March 2006, with the help of attorney Mark Thornhill from Kansas City, Missouri, Professors Wesson and Dennis Van Gerven obtained permission from a judge in Lawrence, Kansas to disinter the disputed remains, which were buried at Oak Hill Cemetery in that city. In May 2006, accompanied by a film crew, anthropology graduate students, and a few of Hillmon's descendants, they excavated the grave, with the goal of using modern forensics to identify the body. A backhoe was used to remove the first couple of feet of soil, then shovels for the next few feet, and lastly hands and hand tools when it was decided that the potentially fragile remains might be too close to continue the use of larger tools. Once the diggers got down deep enough, an underground stream was discovered; it had been flowing through the body and the casket for an indeterminate amount of time. In fact there was not much casket left from the years of spring water flowing through the grave; only a few rusty coffin nails remained of the container.

After hours of careful digging, Van Gerven found 47 bone fragments and 5 teeth, fragmented and eroded from long immersion in the wet ground. Because the frail nature of the remains made physical methods of identification impossible, Wesson and Van Gerven planned to use DNA matching to determine if the bones belonged to John Hillmon (Wesson had managed to track down John Hillmon's half-brother's grandson, Leray Hillmon, and procure a DNA sample). However, the bones did not contain sufficient human DNA to enable testing given that the water and organisms engulfed any human genetic material that might have resided in the remains.

Nevertheless, Van Gerven and his colleagues were able to analyze the photographic evidence available: pictures of the living men John Hillmon and Frederick Adolph Walters, and photographs taken of the corpse during the Lawrence inquest. They used photographical superimposition, which is generally used for exclusion but can be used for positive identification of unique morphological features. Van Gerven used the profile shot of the corpse in the coffin and superimposed it onto pictures of John Hillmon and Frederick A. Walters. “The profile image of the corpse was then digitally rotated into a vertical axis matching the life photographs,” Van Gerven explained in his report. The pictures were then matched using standard anatomical points (the lower margin of the chin and a point at the top of the nasal bones between the eyes) in order to establish scale. The results showed a striking similarity between the corpse and Hillmon's photograph in their nasal profiles, hairlines, eyebrow positions, and lips. With these results, Van Gerven concluded that the corpse more closely matched John Hillmon than Frederick Walters.

== Documentary Film ==
A movie named Hillmon’s Bones was made to document the exhumation and resulting forensic determinations. Directed by Professor Ernesto Acevedo-Munoz of the University of Colorado, the film also tells the Hillmon story through interviews with Professors Wesson and Van Gerven, and the other participants in the research.

== Federal Rule of Evidence 803(3) ==
Hillmon has been codified by Federal Rule of Evidence 803(3), has found its way into the evidence rules of all or nearly all American states, and has been adopted in international jurisdictions including England and Australia. FRE 803(3) makes hearsay admissible if it is "a statement of the declarant’s then existing state of mind, emotion, sensation or physical condition (such as intent, plan, motive, design, mental feeling, pain and bodily health), but not including a statement of memory or belief to prove the fact remembered or believed." The advisory committee comments make clear that the Hillmon is the source of the exception.

The Hillmon exception has played a role in several notable cases, including United States v. Pheaster, 544 F.2d 353 (1976). In that case, Angelo Inciso was convicted of kidnapping and sentenced to seventy years in prison, largely on the victim's testimony that he was “going to meet Angelo.” Although some of the appellate judges in that case doubted the fairness of this outcome, they ultimately agreed that the outcome was compelled by the Hillmon doctrine. Professor Wesson has criticized Hillmon as an outcome-oriented decision and argued for its repeal. For a critical analysis of the court's decision, see here.
