= William Hilliard (publisher) =

American publisher, bookseller (1778–1836)

William Hilliard (1778–1836) was a publisher and bookseller in Boston and Cambridge, Massachusetts in the early 19th century. He worked with several business partners through the years, including Jacob Abbot Cummings, James Brown, and Charles C. Little. President Thomas Jefferson selected his firm to supply approximately 7,000 volumes on numerous topics in 1825-1826, to create the University of Virginia Library.

== Biography ==
Hilliard married, and he and his wife had the following children: Foster (1814-1817), James Winthrop (1816-1817), and Francis Hilliard (ca.1808-1878)

=== Bookselling and publishing ===
Hilliard's several bookselling and publishing firms in Boston and Cambridge included:

- Cummings & Hilliard (1812-1820), Boston; with Jacob Abbot Cummings
- Hilliard and Metcalf (ca.1817-1824), Cambridge; with Eliab Wight Metcalf
- Cummings, Hilliard & Co. (ca.1820-1825), Boston; with Timothy H. Carter
- Hilliard, Gray & Co. (1827), with Harrison Gray
- Hilliard, Gray, Little and Wilkins (ca.1826-1827), with Harrison Gray, Charles C. Little, John H. Wilkins
- Hilliard & Brown, Cambridge (ca.1828), with Charles Brown
- Hilliard, Gray & Co. (ca.1832), Washington St., Boston; with Harrison Gray, J.H. Wilkins, James Brown

==== Thomas Jefferson and University of Virginia Library ====
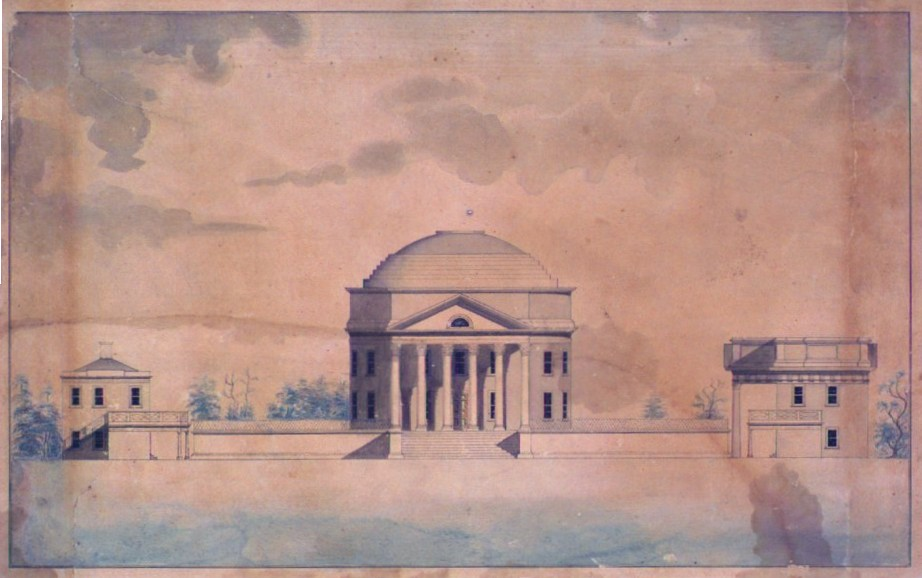
Illustration of the University of Virginia rotunda under construction in 1823 and completed in 1826

In 1825-1826, Cummings, Hilliard & Co. supplied Thomas Jefferson with books for his new library at the University of Virginia.

Jefferson felt the need for an American agent, one who would not only supply books for the Library but who would also set up near the University a bookstore for handling texts to be used by the students. The Boston firm of Cummings, Hilliard and Company was selected, the sum of $18,000 was placed to its credit, and Jefferson undertook to supply a complete list of desirable volumes covering all fields of learning. By June 1825 this list, of nearly 7,000 volumes, had been laboriously completed. ... The purchases made through Cummings, Hilliard and Company began to arrive during the winter of 1825–1826.

A few weeks after Jefferson's death in July 1826, William Hilliard

... with whom there had been much correspondence but whom Jefferson had never met, journeyed to Charlottesville and unpacked and checked the books which had been temporarily stored in the pavilion on West Lawn.

The volumes were shelved in the Rotunda, "the general library of the University of Virginia from 1826 to 1938."

== See also ==
- List of booksellers in Boston
