= Charles J. McCurdy =

American judge

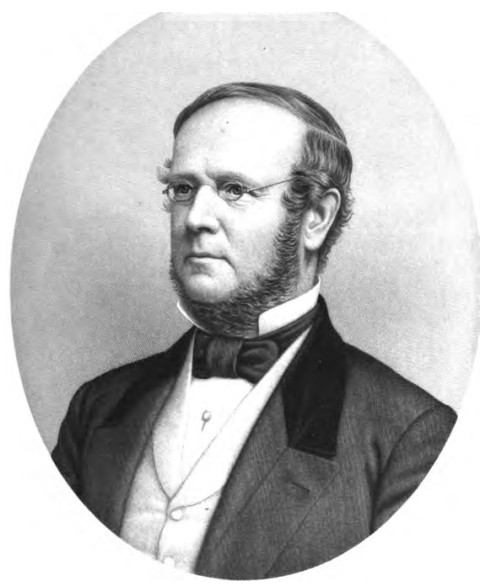

U.S. Chargé to the Austrian Empire
- In office September 27, 1850 – October 12, 1852
- President: Millard Fillmore
- Preceded by: James Watson Webb
- Succeeded by: Thomas M. Foote

40th Lieutenant Governor of Connecticut
- In office 1847–1849
- Governor: Clark Bissell
- Preceded by: Noyes Billings
- Succeeded by: Thomas Backus

Personal details
- Born: Charles Johnson McCurdy; December 7, 1797 Lyme, Connecticut, U.S.
- Died: June 8, 1891 (aged 93) Lyme, Connecticut, U.S.
- Parent(s): Richard McCurdy; Ursula Wolcott Griswold
- Relatives: Robert Henry McCurdy (brother); Roger Wolcott (maternal great-great-grandfather); Oliver Wolcott (maternal great-great-great-uncle); Matthew Griswold (maternal great-grandfather); Richard Aldrich McCurdy (nephew)
- Education: Yale College
- Occupation: Lawyer, diplomat, politician

Charles Johnson McCurdy (December 7, 1797 – June 8, 1891) was an American lawyer, diplomat, and the 40th Lieutenant Governor of Connecticut from 1847 to 1849.

== Early life ==
Charles J. McCurdy was born at Lyme, Connecticut. His father, Richard McCurdy (1769–1857), was a graduate of Yale and a lawyer by profession, but devoted himself to agricultural pursuits and the care of his estate. His mother was Ursula Wolcott Griswold (1775–1811), granddaughter on her father's side of Governor Matthew Griswold, whose wife Ursula was the daughter of governor Roger Wolcott, sister of Oliver Wolcott, aunt of Oliver Wolcott Jr, and mother of Roger Griswold, all of whom were governors of Connecticut. Thus, McCurcy was related to many governors of the state. Among his younger brothers was Robert Henry McCurdy (1800–1880), the co-founder of McCurdy and Aldrich.

He was of Scotch Irish descent on his paternal side; as early as 1503, King James VI leased the vast majority of the Isle of Bute to the MacKurerdy family (later McCurdy). His paternal grandfather, John McCurdy, emigrated to the United States from Ireland in 1745 prior to the Declaration of Independence. His mother's family was of English descent and his maternal great-grandfather, Matthew Griswold, served as the 17th Governor of Connecticut from 1784 to 1786.

McCurdy entered Yale College in 1813, and was graduated in 1817 with high honors.

== Career ==
He studied law under Chief Justice Zephaniah Swift of Windham, Connecticut and was admitted to the bar in 1819.

From 1827 and 1844, McCurdy served in the Connecticut General Assembly, first in the Connecticut House of Representatives where he was Speaker of the House in 1840-41 and 1844. In 1832, he became member of the Connecticut State Senate. He was elected in 1847 and 1848 to succeed Noyes Billings as Lieutenant Governor and President of the Senate.

=== Diplomat and Judge ===
From 1850 until 1852, he was commissioned by then Secretary of State Daniel Webster to serve as U.S. Chargé to the Austrian Empire, succeeding newspaper publisher James Watson Webb (father of H. Walter Webb, William Seward Webb, and Alexander Stewart Webb) who later served as Ambassador to Brazil. After his service, he was relieved by former doctor and newspaper editor Thomas M. Foote In 1861, he was an active member of the Peace Conference of 1861, a meeting held at Willard's Hotel in Washington, DC in an effort to avoid the U.S. Civil War.

In June 1855, he was appointed a judge of the Connecticut Superior Court, and in 1863 a judge of the Connecticut Supreme Court of Errors, which position he held until his retirement by constitutional limitation of age in 1867. Following his retirement, he taught at Yale Law School and received a Doctor of Laws from Yale in 1868.

In 1888, McCurdy issued a pamphlet discussing the "origin of the change in the law by which the last 40 years witnesses have been allowed to testify in court when having an interest in the decision of the suit."

== Personal life ==
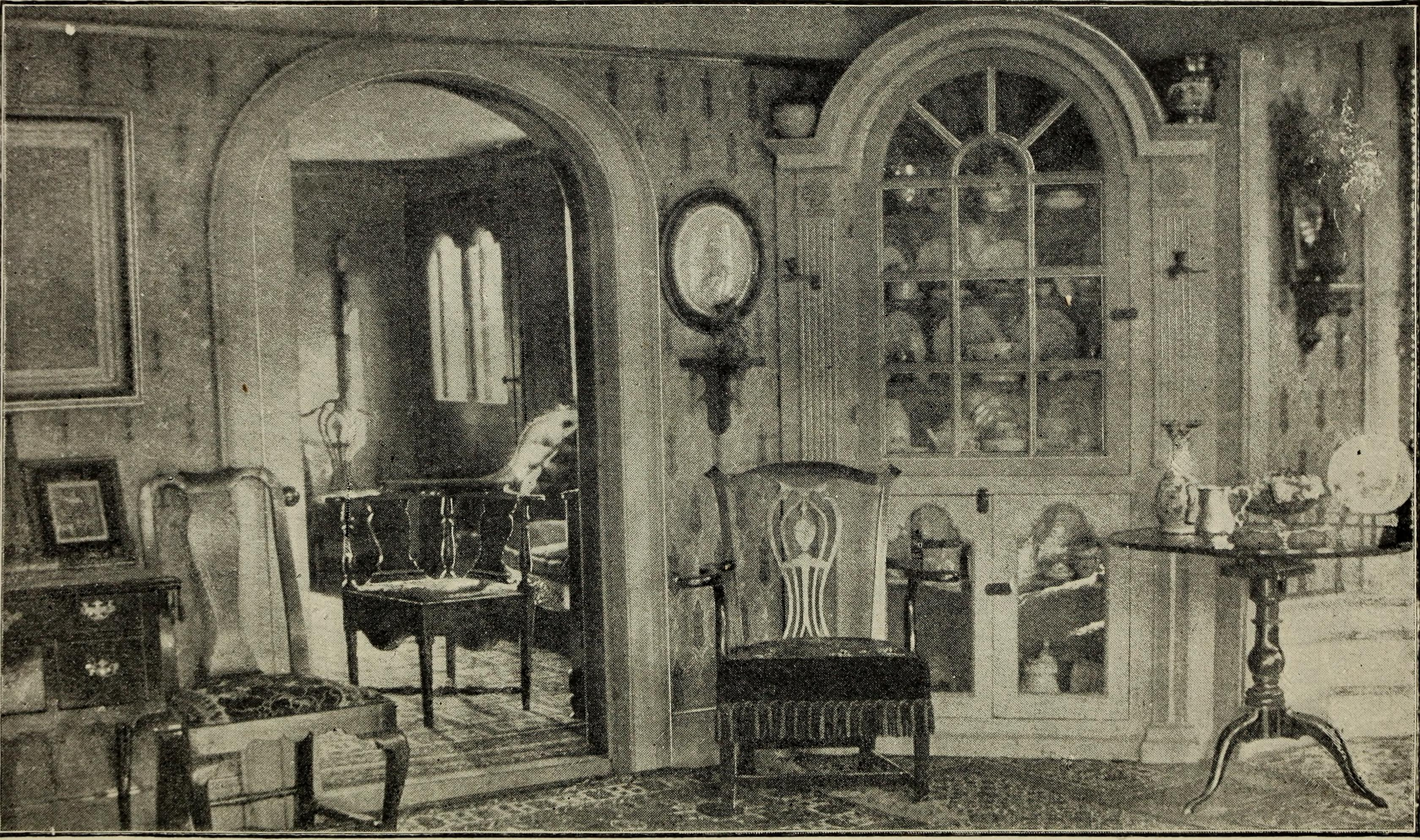
McCurdy's home in Lyme, Connecticut

In 1822, McCurdy was married to Sarah Ann Lord (1800–1835), his second cousin and the daughter of Richard and Anne (née Mitchell) Lord. Before her early death in 1835, they were the parents of one child:

- Evelyn McCurdy (1823–1917), an author who married Edward Elbridge Salisbury (1814–1901).

He did not remarry after his wife's death, instead "the education of this daughter became one of his greatest pleasures, and as she developed and matured into womanhood it was his delight to make her his confidential friend and familiarize her mind with his legal and business affairs, and share with her his political, intellectual, and social interests."

McCurdy died at his home in Lyme, Connecticut on June 8, 1891. At the time of his death, he was the oldest Yale graduate in the state.

Political offices
Preceded by Noyes Billings	Lieutenant Governor of Connecticut; 1847–1849	Succeeded by Thomas Backus
Diplomatic posts
Preceded by James Watson Webb	U.S. Chargé to the Austrian Empire; 1850–1852	Succeeded by Thomas M. Foote
