= James B. Farley =

American businessman and consultant

James B. Farley (November 1, 1930 – January 20, 2007) was an American business executive who served as head of the consulting firm Booz Allen Hamilton before becoming the head of the Mutual Life Insurance Company of New York.

== Early life ==
Farley was born on November 1, 1930, and grew up in Pittsburgh, Pennsylvania. His mother died when he was very young and his father, who owned a small grocery store, was in and out of hospitals. He had two sisters, Bernie (née Farley) Carroll and Roseanne (née Farley) Sansoni.

He earned a business degree from Duquesne University before serving briefly in the U.S. Marine Corps in 1953. While at U.S. Steel, he earned an M.B.A. from Case Western Reserve University.

== Career ==
Farley began his career as an industrial engineer at U.S. Steel where he was transferred to Cleveland, Ohio. While there, he met a number of outside consultants at the company which inspired him, at age 32, to leave U.S. Steel for Booz Allen Hamilton in 1963. While at Booz Allen, he worked on the merger of the American and National Football Leagues, the separation of AT&T and the revival of the Chrysler Corporation.

In 1973, as the firm's finances and share price were falling, its president resigned and Farley was asked to take over. In 1975, he added the title of chief executive officer and became the fourth chairman of the firm in 1976. While president, he took Booz Allen private and changed the firm's focus on a few consulting areas, primarily technology, financial services and general management consulting, while introducing a "collaborative management style to a firm that had always been run autocratically." By 1983, client billings had risen to $250 million from $60 million in 1973 and the firm claimed to be the nation's largest management consulting firm, in billings, and employed a worldwide staff of 2,600.

In 1988, Farley joined the Mutual Life Insurance Company of New York, also known as MONY, as president and chief operating officer, replacing James A. Attwood. At the time, MONY managed "$23 billion in assets and [wa]s the nation's ninth-largest mutual life insurance company." He was named chairman and chief executive a year later in 1989. In 1990, he relinquished the presidency to MONY's former chief financial officer, Michael I. Roth, a certified public accountant and lawyer. He served as chairman until July 1993, and stayed on as a director until 2003 after it was announced that MONY was to be acquired by AXA Financial, Inc.

== Personal life ==
In February 1952, Farley was married to his high school sweetheart, Mary Williams (1932-2014). Together, they were the parents of two sons and two daughters, all of whom have M.B.A.'s, James J. Farley (who married Julia), Mickey Farley (who married artist Robin Austin), Connie Farley (who married Tim O'Connor), and J. Scott Farley, who married Sue.

Farley died, after a prolonged illness, at his home in Gulf Stream, Florida on January 20, 2007.
