= Mason Hawkins =

American value investor

Otis "Mason" Hawkins
- Education: University of Florida; University of Georgia
- Known for: Founded Southeastern Asset Management, Inc. in 1975
- Board member of: Charter School Growth Fund

Otis "Mason" Hawkins is an American value investor and the founder, chairman, and former chief executive officer of Southeastern Asset Management, Inc. In 1975, Hawkins founded Southeastern Asset Management, a $35 billion employee-owned, global investment management firm and the investment advisor to the Longleaf Partners Funds, a suite of mutual funds and UCITS funds.

== Professional history ==
Hawkins was Director of Research at First Tennessee Investment Management (1974–1975) and Director of Research at Atlantic National Bank (1972–1973), prior to founding Southeastern. He received a B.A. in Finance from the University of Florida in 1970 and an M.B.A. in Finance from the University of Georgia in 1971. Hawkins also holds the Chartered Financial Analyst (CFA) designation.

In 1975, Hawkins founded Southeastern Asset Management and later launched the Longleaf Partners Funds, a suite of mutual funds and UCITS funds, in 1987.

== Investment strategy ==
Hawkins is a value investor. When considering prospective investments, he looks for three criteria: strong businesses with good people, at deeply discounted prices.

Hawkins invests in businesses with solid balance sheets. He looks for businesses that trade at far below intrinsic value and have a capable management team, which are important factors for long-term success. His firm, Southeastern Asset Management, has concentrated portfolios with typically 18-22 stocks.

== Awards ==
Hawkins received Institutional Investor (magazine)’s Lifetime Achievement Award in 2005. He and Southeastern Asset Management President and Chief Investment Officer Staley Cates were also named Morningstar, Inc. Domestic Equity Fund Managers of the Year in 2006 and were nominees for the same in 2003 and 2009. Hawkins’s firm, Southeastern Asset Management, was selected as Equity Manager of the Year at the Foundation and Endowment Money Management’s Nonprofit Awards for Excellence in 2007.

Southeastern Asset Management's investment approach and Hawkins as its leader were featured in Chapter 10 of Yale endowment Chief Investment Officer David Swensen’s book Unconventional Success.
