= Herman D. Aldrich =

American businessman and philanthropist

- Born: Herman Daggett Aldrich; July 6, 1801; Mattituck, Suffolk County, New York, U.S.
- Died: April 5, 1880 (aged 78); New York City, U.S.
- Resting place: Green-Wood Cemetery, Brooklyn, New York, U.S.
- Occupation: Businessman
- Spouse: Elizabeth Wyman (after 1840)
- Children: 5
- Parent: James Aldrich
- Relatives: Thomas Underwood Dudley (son-in-law)

Herman Daggett Aldrich (July 6, 1801 – April 5, 1880) was an American businessman and philanthropist in the Gilded Age.

== Early life ==
Herman Daggett Aldrich was born on July 6, 1801, in Mattituck, New York. His father, James Aldrich, was of English descent. His nephew, Herman D. Aldrich Jr. married in 1860.

== Career ==
Aldrich moved to New York City, where he worked for Stephen Lockwood, a merchant.

In 1820, Aldrich co-founded McCurdy and Aldrich, a dry goods commission firm, with Robert Henry McCurdy. It later became known as McCurdy, Aldrich and Spencer. The three partners retired c. 1860, when it became Low, Harriman & Co., founded by Oliver Harriman and his father-in-law, James Low.

Aldrich made charitable contributions to St. Luke's Hospital Center.

== Personal life ==
In 1840, Aldrich married Elizabeth Wyman (1821–1904), the daughter of Hannah D. Mayo and Samuel Wyman, who donated Wyman Park to Johns Hopkins University. They resided on 14th Street, until they moved to 200 Madison Avenue, both of which are located in Manhattan, New York City. In addition to three children who died in childhood, they had three sons and two daughters:

- Mary Elizabeth Aldrich (d. 1919), who married Thomas Underwood Dudley (1837–1904), the second Episcopal Bishop of Kentucky.
- James Herman Aldrich (1843–1917), who married Mary Gertrude Edson (1850–1924).
- William Wyman Aldrich (1849–1891)
- Helen Hudson Aldrich (1851–1926), who married Rev. Dr. James Nevett Steele (1850–1916) of the Trinity Church. He was the nephew of Rep. John Nevett Steele.
- Spencer Aldrich (1854–1936), who married Harriet Dall Hall (1855–1937) in 1878.

Aldrich died on April 5, 1880, at his Madison Avenue residence. His funeral was held as a joint ceremony with Robert Henry McCurdy, who died on the same day, at the Calvary Church on Wednesday morning. The funeral was attended by Peter Cooper, William E. Dodge, Frederick Theodore Frelinghuysen, James Watson Webb, Thurlow Weed, etc. His sermon was given by Bishop Henry C. Potter and Reverend E. A. Washburne of the Episcopal Church. He was buried at the Green-Wood Cemetery, next to McCurdy.

His estate built Aldrich Court, a skyscraper located at 41-45 Broadway in Manhattan, between 1886 and 1887. By September 1905, his extensive real estate holdings, inherited by his widow and valued at US$5 million, were auctioned off.

=== Descendants ===
His granddaughter through his on William, Elizabeth Wyman Aldrich, was married to Jacob Berry Underhill, son of Edward B. Underhil in 1892. The Wedding was performed by Aldrich's son-in-law, Bishop Dudley and the reception was hosted by his widow at their home at 200 Madison Avenue.
