= Mutual Life Insurance Company of New York =

American life insurance company

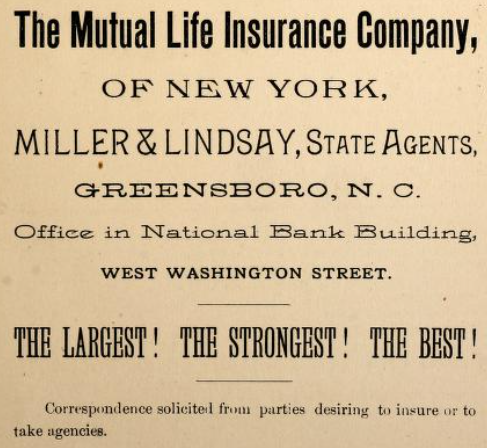
1892 advertisement for the company in Greensboro, North Carolina

The Mutual Life Insurance Company of New York (also known as Mutual of New York or MONY) was the oldest continuous writer of insurance policies in the United States. Incorporated in 1842, it was headquartered at 1740 Broadway, before becoming a wholly owned subsidiary of AXA Financial, Inc. in 2004.

== History ==
In 1841 Alfred Shipley Pell, (Note: Alfred Shipley Pell was a nephew of William Ferris Pell, and a first cousin of Lt.-Gov. Duncan Pell and Robert Livingston Pell, all descendants of Thomas Pell, 1st Lord of the Pelham Manor.) who had worked for the Mutual Safety Insurance Company, and businessman Morris Robinson, decided to form a life insurance company with Robinson as president. They received a charter from the state of New York for The Mutual Life Insurance Company of New York on April 12, 1842, and opened the doors for business less than a year later on February 1, 1843. The company was formed at the beginning what became an eight-year period that saw the founding of several other major insurance companies like New York Life (1845), Massachusetts Mutual (1851), and Aetna (1853).

From its inception, the Mutual Life was a mutual company that was owned by its policyholders and run by a board of trustees elected by policyowners. (Note: The founding trustees of the Mutual Life Insurance Company of New York included Robert Henry McCurdy.) The company offered whole life and term insurance and helped develop mortality tables, actuarial science, and premium calculations. It was originally serviced large eastern cities but expanded, through company agents, around the country. After the death of Robinson in 1849, he was succeeded by Joseph B. Collins. Mutual Life formalized its system in 1858 when the first general agent was appointed. Known for its conservative approach, it precluded issuing policies to people traveling to China or around the Cape of Good Hope, or to seamen engaged in whaling as well as "gamblers, barkeepers... saloon keepers, keepers of billiard parlors," according to the company's 1886 policy handbook. Similarly, the company followed a conservative investment approach by investing heavily in government securities, New York state bonds, and real estate mortgages.

During the Civil War all operations below the Mason–Dixon line ceased and the company did not suffer any losses on war risks, likely because no policies provided for insurance in the case of war. The company's assets grew from $1.3 million in 1851 to $44 million in 1870, largely under the presidency of Frederick S. Winston from 1853 to 1885 (Collins left Mutual Life to become president of the United States Life Insurance Company). In 1866, the company began paying annual dividends to avoid competition from companies like New York Life and The Equitable, which together were known as the "Big Three", between 1870 and 1906.

=== Gilded Age expansion ===
After the death of Winston in March 1885, Richard McCurdy succeeded to the presidency, the same year the Company introduced deferred dividend policies. Within three years, less than 1% of the company's new business consisted of the old annual dividend policies. McCurdy, a company vice president, sent agents throughout the West and Southwest and pursued an ambitious investment approach, doubling new insurance in the first three years of his presidency. By 1904, it had quadrupled. In 1889, Mutual Life surpassed New York Life in new business, and in 1893, it bested The Equitable. In the 1880s, Mutual Life began building large office buildings and renting out excess space in addition to buying other banks' debentures.

In 1886, Mutual Life established agencies in London, Berlin, Hamburg, Sydney, Mexico City, and in Puerto Rico. During the following twenty years, nineteen additional agencies were established abroad. The rapid expansion was met with difficulties as Prussia prohibited the company from doing business there in 1900, and followed by Germany in 1904. By 1914, all of the company's foreign agencies were closed.

During the Armstrong Investigation of 1905, which was charged by the New York State Legislature to look into fraud and abuse in the New York insurance industry, the company was a chief target and McCurdy and other executives testified before the committee. The legislature placed new restrictions, including prohibiting insurance companies from holding of common stock, limiting the amount of new insurance any company could issue in a year, and prohibiting the deferred dividend policies. A visible target, McCurdy resigned in late 1905 and the company restructured from a general agency system to a managerial agency system where the general commission agents became salaried branch-office managers.

=== Peabody and Houston years ===
After the "sensational insurance investigations by the Armstrong committee," McCurdy was succeeded by Charles A. Peabody Jr., a former lawyer whose father, Charles Augustus Peabody, was a founding trustee. Peabody served as president until 1927 when he was succeeded by David F. Houston, the former U.S. Secretary of the Treasury and Agriculture (under President Woodrow Wilson). Houston ran Mutual Life until 1940. Under Peabody and Houston, Mutual Life went through another period of nearly uninterrupted growth and extended coverage to the American middle class and working class. In 1913, the Company introduced disability benefits and, in 1925, payroll deduction was introduced allowing the payment of premiums of group coverage. Between 1903 and 1930, the company's insurance tripled, from $1.5 billion to nearly $4.5 billion and assets grew from $401 million to $1.05 billion.

During the Great Depression, however, the Company terminated a number of employees, service contractors, and experienced a series of policy lapses which caused a dip in assets and a decline of insurance in force. By 1931, disability income benefits connected to life insurance policies were discontinued. Nevertheless, new products were introduced during the 1930s, including a family protection policy in 1934 and a family income plan in 1940. In 1942, the company's amount of insurance in force was approximately $3.6 billion, only 80% of the 1930 total.

=== World War II and post-war period ===
In 1940, Lewis Williams Douglas was elected president who again changed the company's investment approach which had, traditionally, been invested in low-interest, low-risk bonds. In 1944, 83% of the company's assets were invested in bonds, with less than 1% in stocks and 13% was in mortgages. By the 1950s, insurance companies began to more heavily invest in the stock market and diversified into lending. By 1959, bonds accounted for less than half of the company's assets, while stocks had grown six-fold to constitute 6% and mortgages were up to 32%. Upon being nominated by President Harry Truman as U.S. Ambassador to the United Kingdom in 1947, Alexander E. Patterson was named president, serving until his death in September 1948. Louis W. Dawson had active charge of operations following Paterson's death, but was not elected president until March 1950.

Mutual Life reentered Alaska in 1949 and Texas shortly thereafter in 1950. In 1952, the company began offering personal sickness and health policies before the strength of unions and collective bargaining units which led to the development of group coverage. In 1953, the Company developed its first group plan for small businesses, whereby it provided pension, life insurance, disability, hospital, surgical, and polio benefits. By 1959, the company's assets had grown to $2.7 billion and insurance in force reached $7 billion.

In September 1959, Roger Hull became president and chief executive officer while Louis W. Dawson was elected to chairman of the board of trustees (replacing Douglas). During his tenure the Company expanded significantly and the developed new coverages including the first substandard-risk accident and health policy in 1963. In 1965, Mutual Life became the first New York firm to enter the group variable-annuity field. By 1971, assets totaled nearly $4 billion and insurance in force was nearly $17 billion. In 1967, Hull was also elected chairman of the company. and J. McCall Hughes became president. In the 1960s, the Company adopted MONY, pronounced money, as its logotype. Its sign above 1740 Broadway featured prominently in the film Midnight Cowboy and would serve as the basis for Tommy James and the Shondells’ hit song “Mony Mony”.

=== 1970s and 1980s ===
Prior to the 1970s, growth largely occurred from new products and services generated from within. In the 1970s, however, Mutual Life began acquiring other companies and developing new ones which rapidly added to services. In 1970, the company established an investment fund known as the MONY Fund and, in 1971, it acquired North American Life and Casualty Company. In February 1972, following the death of Roger Hull, Hughes served as chairman and chief executive officer. In October 1967, James S. Bingay, became president and chief executive officer while Richard I. Fricke became chairman. In 1973, formed MONY Life of Canada, to service the Canadian market, and MONYCo., a holding company to manage its newly acquired and newly formed subsidiaries. In 1975 the Company entered the property-and-liability reinsurance business. Bingay died in 1976, and was succeeded by James E. Devitt as president and chief executive officer.

While the 1970s saw the oil crisis and the recession due to high inflation, the Company nevertheless continued to grow and remained the 11th-largest insurance company in the United States throughout most of the 1970s. Between 1970 and 1979, insurance in force doubled, from nearly $16 billion to $33.9 billion.

In 1983, James A. Attwood was elected as the 14th chief executive of Mutual Life following Devitt's retirement. Attwood was previously a senior executive vice president and chief investment officer at The Equitable and was the first president of Mutual Life to come from outside the company. Before 1983, the company had seven subsidiaries but by 1987, the number of its subsidiaries totaled thirty-three. In 1985, the company acquired the investment consultant group Evaluation Associates, Inc., followed in 1986 by both Atlanta-based Financial Services Corporation, a broker-dealer firm, and Unified Management Corporation, an investment management company which at the time was the tenth-largest mortgage company in the United States. In 1987, it the acquired the third-party administrator Kelly & Associates in 1987.

Attwood restructured the company in 1985 in an attempt to manage the company's rapid growth and assortment of subsidiaries, reorganizing several operations, separating its design and sales units, and dividing the primary businesses into five units. In the 1980s, the company's financial services were expanded including its pension division, which was formed in 1981. The pension division grew to manage $8.7 billion in pension funds by 1989.

By 1989, the Mutual Life's total assets under management were nearly $22 billion and its insurance in force was $84 billion, up from $51 billion in 1983. Despite its monumental growth, its overall share of the market slipped and ended 1987 as the nation's 14th-largest insurer in terms of assets, 20th in terms of new policies issued, and 24th in terms of total life insurance in force. In 1989, the Company sold Financial Services Corporation, just three years after it had acquired the broker-dealer firm. In 1988, after business consultant James B. Farley became the new leader of the company, he initiated a vast cost cutting program due to the company's over-investment in real estate and junk bonds. Farley was the former head of Booz, Allen & Hamilton.

=== 1990s and 2000s ===
In November 1990, Michael I. Roth was named president and chief operating officer of Mutual Life, succeeding Farley who continued as chairman and chief executive. Roth joined MONY in 1988 as chief financial officer after leaving Primerica Corporation (formerly the American Can Company) as executive vice president and chief financial officer. In October 1992, Roth also became chief executive of Mutual Life.

In 1998, Mutual Life was renamed Mutual of New York Insurance Company, as part of its transformation into a publicly traded company. The company planned to issue 34 million shares to its 900,000 policyholders, and to sell 11.3 million other shares. Following its IPO, where it distributed shares to policyholders and selling stock to the public at $23.50 per share, the Mony Life Insurance Company, a unit of Mony Group Inc., acquired the Cincinnati-based U.S. Financial Life Insurance Company for $48 million.

In August 2000, MONY acquired Advest Group, a brokerage firm based in Hartford, for approximately $275 million in stock and cash. In February 2001, MONY purchased a small mergers-and-acquisitions specialist, Matrix, that was based in Richmond, Virginia. In October 2001, the MONY Group acquired municipal bond retailer Lebenthal & Company as a subsidiary of its Advest Group. The CEO of Lebenthal, Alexandra Lebenthal, remained as president of the division.

=== Acquisition by AXA ===
In September 2003, AXA Financial, Inc. announced a takeover offer of $1.5 billion for MONY Group of New York, which some of its largest shareholders, including Highfields Capital Management, Third Avenue Management, Southeastern Asset Management and Advisory Research, immediately objected to as being too low. The offer was accepted by shareholders in May 2004, and on July 8, 2004, MONY became a wholly owned subsidiaries of European insurer, allowing AXA to become "the fourth-largest seller of variable annuities in the United States and the largest seller of variable life insurance."

As part of the takeover, MONY's chief executive, Michael I. Roth, stood "to receive as much as $23.3 million, including payments for vested stock options". Additionally, Mony's president and CEO, Samuel J. Foti (who joined the company in 1988 from the Metropolitan Life Insurance Company), may get as much as $16.4 million; the chief investment officer, Kenneth M. Levine (who joined MONY in 1972), as much as $12.7 million; and the chief financial officer, Richard Daddario, as much as $9.13 million.

== Mutual of New York Building ==
In 1950, Mutual of New York built a 26-story building on the east side of Broadway, between 55th and 56th Streets, in the Midtown Manhattan neighborhood of New York City, for its corporate headquarters and hired Shreve, Lamb and Harmon to design it. MONY left the building after being acquired by Axa.

== List of chief executives ==
- 1842–1849: Morris Robinson
- 1849-1853: Joseph B. Collins
- 1853–1885: Frederick S. Winston
- 1885–1905: Richard Aldrich McCurdy
- 1906–1927: Charles A. Peabody Jr.
- 1927–1940: David F. Houston
- 1940–1947: Lewis Williams Douglas
- 1947–1948: Alexander E. Patterson
- 1948–1961: Louis W. Dawson (acting from 1948 to 1950)
- 1961–1972: Roger Hull
- 1972–1972: J. McCall Hughes
- 1972–1976: James S. Bingay
- 1976–1983: James E. Devitt
- 1983–1988: James A. Attwood
- 1988–1992: James B. Farley
- 1992–2004: Michael I. Roth

== See also ==
- Mutual Life Insurance Co. of New York v. Hillmon (1892)
- Mutual Life Insurance Co of New York v Rank Organisation Ltd (1985)
