= James A. Attwood =

American insurance executive

James Albert Attwood Sr. (June 1, 1927 – October 31, 1989) was an American insurance executive.

== Early life ==
Attwood was born on June 1, 1927, in Detroit, Michigan and graduated from the University of Michigan. His two sisters were Evelyn (née Attwood) Hansen and Beatrice (née Attwood) Smith.

== Career ==
Attwood began his career as an actuary at The Equitable Life Assurance Society, eventually serving as senior executive vice president and chief investment officer. In 1983, he joined the Mutual Life Insurance Company of New York, and became its chairman and chief executive before he retired in July 1988. In joining MONY, Attwood went "to the ninth-largest mutual insurance company from the third largest and will be moving three and a half blocks in Manhattan to his new headquarters." He was MONY's 14th chief executive in its 140-year history. While at MONY, he diversified the insurance company's holdings into "a modified life insurance company providing a broader range of financial services". In 1987, Richard S. Schweiker, then president of the American Council of Life Insurance (and former U.S. Senator from Pennsylvania and the U.S. Secretary of Health and Human Services), said of him:

"Jim Attwood is a person who has a clear, set goal and works constantly toward it. He has certainly taken a very strong leadership role in the insurance industry."

He also served as a vice president of the Society of Actuaries, and was a member of the board of the Committee for Economic Development and the New York City Partnership, Fisk University and the New York Theological Seminary.

== Personal life ==
Attwood was married to Pauline, the director of the Bronxville Adult School. Together, they lived in Bronxville, New York and were the parents of:

- James Albert Attwood Jr., an investment banker at Goldman Sachs who married Leslie Kim Williams.
- Terry Jo Attwood, who married Thomas J. R. Beckmann, a son of Harry L. Beckmann, in 1986.
- Dorothy Tyyne Attwood, who married William Albert Dupont, son of Ralph P. Dupont and Judge Antoinette L. Dupont, in 1983.
- Katherine Attwood

Attwood died of acute anemia at New York Hospital on October 31, 1989.
