= 1740 Broadway =

Office skyscraper in Manhattan, New York

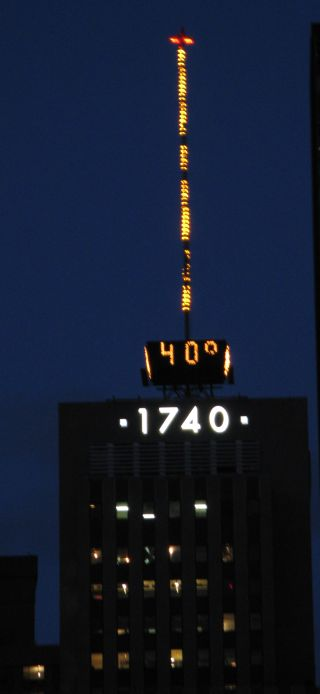
- Former names: Mutual of New York Building

General information
- Coordinates: 40°45′54″N 73°58′54″W
- Completed: 1950
- Owner: EQ Office

Height
- Antenna spire: 514 ft (157 m)
- Roof: 375 ft (114 m)

Technical details
- Floor count: 26
- Floor area: approx. 600,000 sq ft (56,000 m^{2})
- Lifts/elevators: 14 (13 passenger, 1 freight)

Design and construction
- Architect: Shreve, Lamb & Harmon Associates

1740 Broadway (formerly the MONY Building or Mutual of New York Building) is a 26-story building on the east side of Broadway, between 55th and 56th Streets, in the Midtown Manhattan neighborhood of New York City. The building is owned by EQ Office and shares a city block with the Park Central Hotel.

Mutual of New York built the structure in 1950 for its corporate headquarters and hired Shreve, Lamb and Harmon as architects. It left the building after being acquired by Axa. The building was completely renovated in 2007. Blackstone bought the building in 2014 and took out a $200 million loan. In 2024, Yellowstone Real Estate bought the building's loan and considered converting the structure to residential use.

== Signage on the facade ==
Its most famous attribute was once a sign at the top of its façade which advertised for Mutual of New York, the structure's original owner. The first version spelled out the entire name, with the first letter of each of the words in it (MONY) being red neon lighting which was twice the size of the rest. It was in this form that the sign served as both the inspiration for Tommy James and the Shondells' 1968 hit single "Mony Mony" and as a motif in Midnight Cowboy. The subsequent version was the corporate logo, which was the insurance company's acronym with a dollar sign inside the "O."

The MONY sign was removed by Vornado in December 2007, and replaced with "1740" to reflect its street address. The numerals, 8 1/2 feet (2.6 meters) tall and in Futura typeface, are illuminated at night by light-emitting diodes.

== The Weather Star ==
Perched on the roof is the Weather Star, a 150-foot (46 m) tower of lights topped with a star-shaped weather beacon which was built by Artkraft Strauss. The star was green if the following day's weather forecast was fair, orange for cloudy, flashing orange for rain, and flashing white for snow. The direction the lights on the tower moved depended on whether the temperatures were expected to rise or fall; absence of movement meant no change. The Weather Star is still operable, but is no longer used for meteorological forecasting purposes. An electronic digital board with four sides that has always shown the time and temperature is located at the base of the tower.

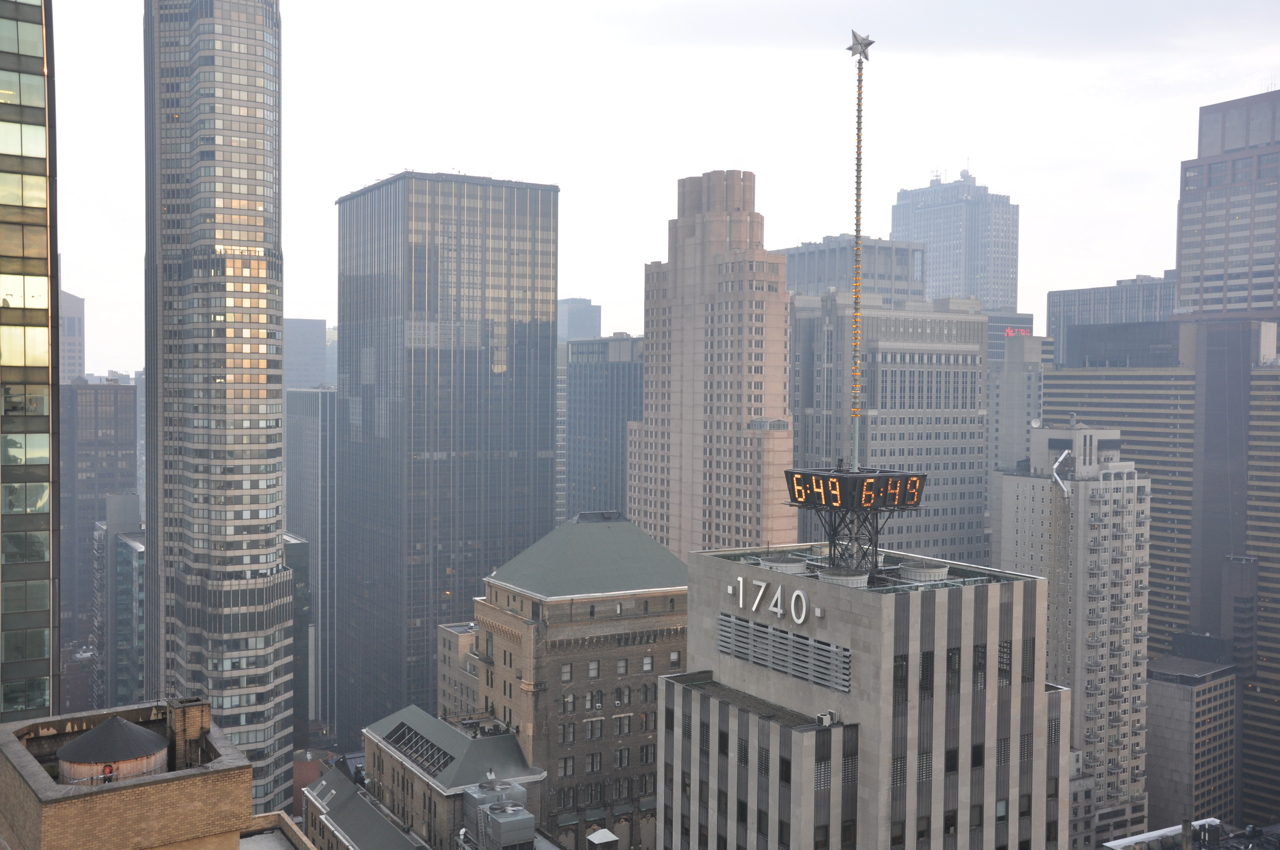
Daytime View of the 1740 Broadway Building from another Tower. The "Weather Star" can be seen on top.
