= James Brown (publisher) =

American publisher (1800–1855)

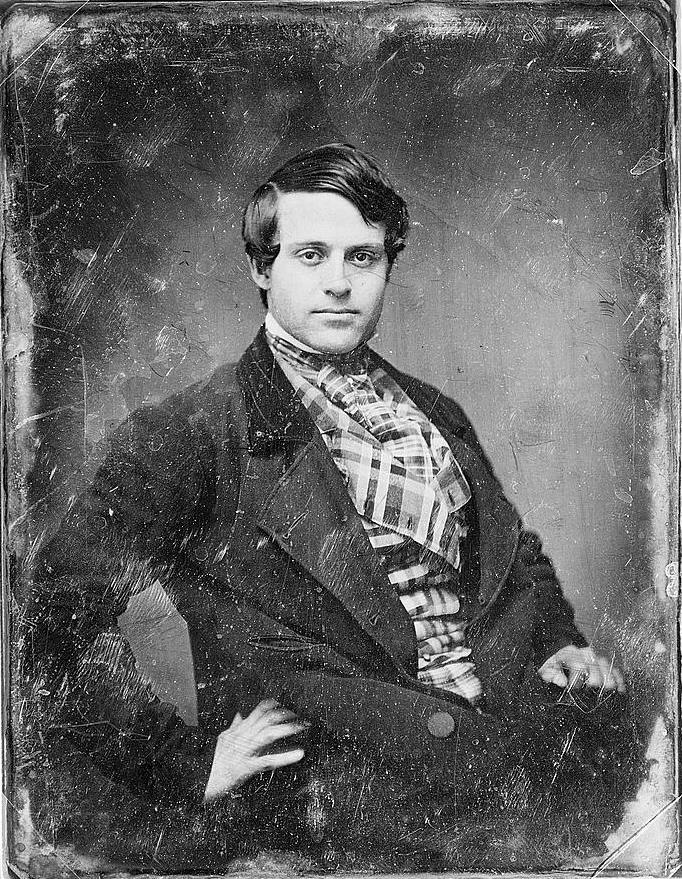
- Born: May 19, 1800; Acton, Massachusetts, US
- Died: March 10, 1855 (aged 54); Watertown, Massachusetts, US
- Occupations: publisher and businessman
- Organization: Little, Brown and Company

James Brown (May 19, 1800 – March 10, 1855) was an American publisher and co-founder of Little, Brown and Company with Charles Coffin Little.

== Early life and education ==
Brown was born in Acton, Massachusetts, on May 19, 1800. He started his working life as a servant in the family of Levi Hedge, a professor from Cambridge, Massachusetts, who instructed him in the classics and mathematics.

== Career ==
Around 1832, he began to work with Hilliard, Gray & Co. on Washington Street in Boston, where he worked with William Hilliard and others. He was originally hired as a clerk. The firm was dissolved following the death of one of its partners, and Brown then began working for Charles C. Little & Co., run by Charles Coffin Little, also as a clerk.

In 1837, the firm became Charles C. Little and James Brown, and Brown remained there until his death. Augustus Flagg joined them in 1838 and became the publishing house's managing partner after the deaths of the two founders.

The firm's name was changed to Little, Brown and Company in 1847.

In 1853, Little, Brown began publishing the works of British poets, from Chaucer to Wordsworth. There were 96 volumes published in the series in five years, but Brown did not live to see its completion.

== Death ==
Brown died in Watertown, Massachusetts, on March 10, 1855, at the age of 54.

His son John Murray Brown took over when Flagg retired in 1884. A life of James Brown, by George Stillman Hillard, was published in Boston, in 1855.
