= James E. Devitt =

James E. Devitt (1920 – May 1994) was an American lawyer and insurance executive who served as president of the Mutual Life Insurance Company of New York.

== Early life ==
He was a son of Louis James Devitt (1892–1985) and Nora Gertrude (née Cavanaugh) Devitt (1894–1982). Among his siblings was brother William Louis Devitt, also a soldier and lawyer, who wrote Shavetail: The Odyssey of an Infantry Lieutenant in World War II.

Devitt graduated from the University of Minnesota before attending Harvard Law School, from where he graduated in 1949. During World War II, he served as a major in the U.S. Army.

== Career ==
After practicing law in St. Paul, Minnesota for two years, he began a career in insurance with the Northwestern National Life Insurance Company in 1951.

In 1956, Devitt joined Mutual Life Insurance Company of New York as director of group operations, becoming senior vice president in 1969 and executive vice president in 1972. In 1976, he was elected president of Mutual Life, which at the time was the nation's 19th largest life insurance company. He became chairman in 1978 before he retired in 1983 after 26 years with MONY.

== Personal life ==
Devitt died of complications from Alzheimer's disease in May 1994 at Manatee Memorial Hospital in Bradenton, Florida. He lived in Holmes Beach, Florida and was survived by his widow, Judith.
