= Southeastern Asset Management =

Southeastern Asset Management, Inc.
- Type: Independent Investment Advisory Firm
- Industry: Global Investment Management
- Founded: 1975
- Headquarters: Memphis, Tennessee, United States
- Area served: Worldwide
- Key people: O. Mason Hawkins (Founder); Ross Glotzbach (Chief Executive); G. Staley Cates (Chief Investment Officer)
- AUM: US $6.9 Billion (as of November 2022)
- Number of employees: Approximately 60 (2013)
- Website: Southeastern Asset Management

Southeastern Asset Management is an American employee-owned, global investment management firm founded in 1975 by O. Mason Hawkins and the investment advisor to the Longleaf Partners Funds, a suite of mutual funds and UCITS funds. Southeastern has approximately 60 employees worldwide, as of December 2013, and is headquartered in Memphis, Tennessee, with additional offices in London, England; Singapore; and Sydney, Australia.

Approximately 60% of Southeastern's assets under management is in separately managed accounts for institutional investors, and the remaining 40% is invested in the Longleaf Partners Mutual and UCITS Funds. The firm invests across four mandates: U.S. Large Cap, U.S. Small Cap, Non-U.S., and Global. As of November 2022, the firm had $6.9 billion in assets under management.

== History ==
Southeastern Asset Management was founded by Mason Hawkins in 1975. In 1987, Southeastern created the Longleaf Partners Fund, its first mutual fund product, in order to allow its employees to invest in the funds owned by its clients. The Longleaf Small-Cap Fund was seeded two years later in 1989 as a way to invest in undervalued businesses that were too small for the firm's existing portfolios. The Small-Cap Fund later closed to new investors in 1997 and remains closed today.

=== Longleaf Partners Mutual Funds ===
The Longleaf Partners Funds is a suite of mutual fund and UCITS fund products introduced into the market by Southeastern Asset Management in 1987 as a way for Southeastern employees to invest in the funds they managed. Southeastern's employees and their immediate families are limited by the firm's code of ethics to invest in public equities through the firm's funds unless granted an exception.

Longleaf's flagship fund, Longleaf Partners Fund, was launched in 1987 and was later followed by Longleaf Partners Small-Cap Fund in 1989, Longleaf Partners International Fund in 1998, and Longleaf Partners Global Fund in 2012.

=== Separately Managed Accounts ===
Southeastern provides separately managed accounts for institutional investors with three mandates: U.S., Non-U.S. and Global. Its U.S. mandate dates back to 1975 and its Non-U.S. mandate began in 1998. In 2000, Southeastern created its Global separately managed account mandate for institutional investors, combining U.S. and non-U.S. companies in one portfolio in 2000.

=== Longleaf Partners UCITS Funds ===
Longleaf Partners’ Global UCITS fund was created in 2010 for investors outside of the U.S. In 2012, the Longleaf Partners U.S. UCITS Fund was launched for investors outside of the U.S. to invest in U.S.-based companies.

== Leadership ==
=== Mason Hawkins ===
Mason Hawkins is the Founder and Chairman of Southeastern Asset Management, Inc. He has been in the investment business for more than 40 years and has been the recipient of various industry awards throughout his career, including Institutional Investor's Lifetime Achievement Award, which he received in 2005.

Prior to founding Southeastern, Hawkins was the Director of Research at Atlantic National Bank from 1972 to 1973 and then held the same position at the First Tennessee Investment Management from 1974 to 1975.

Hawkins earned a B.A. in Finance from the University of Florida and an M.B.A. in Finance from the University of Georgia. He also holds the Chartered Financial Analyst (CFA) designation.

=== Ross Glotzbach ===
Ross Glotzbach was named the Chief executive officer of Southeastern Asset Management, Inc. on January 1, 2019. Glotzbach has been with the company since 2004.

=== Staley Cates ===
Staley Cates is the President and Chief investment officer of Southeastern Asset Management. He joined Southeastern in 1986 after graduating from the University of Texas with a bachelor's degree in Business Administration. In 1994, he took over as President of Southeastern Asset Management.

Prior to joining Southeastern, Cates worked as a research associate at Morgan Keegan & Company. He has more than 29 years of investment experience.
