= Roger Hull (insurance executive) =

James Roger Hull (November 17, 1907 – February 6, 1972) was an American insurance executive who spent his entire career with the Mutual Life Insurance Company of New York, becoming president in 1959 and chairman in 1967.

== Early life ==
Hull was born in State College, Mississippi on November 17, 1907. He was the son of Madge Cook (née Wilson) Hull and Dr. David Carlisle Hull, the President of Mississippi State University from 1920 to 1925.

He earned an A.B. degree from Kentucky Wesleyan College, a private Methodist college in Owensboro, Kentucky, of which his father had been president from 1925 until his death in 1928.

== Career ==
In 1928, after considering graduate study at Harvard, Hull turned down an offer from "a relative to join him in the feed‐manufacturing business" and, instead, became a salesman for Mutual Life Insurance Company of New York in Meridian, Mississippi. He was an organizer of the first Mississippi Junior Chamber of Commerce, eventually becoming its president. He also served as president of the Meridian Chamber of Commerce, was a trustee of the city library and vice president of the Kiwanis. In 1932, Hull was appointed district manager for MONY in Meridian and in 1935, he was made manager of the company's agency in Nashville. In 1938, he moved to New York as assistant superintendent of agencies, before becoming executive vice president and a trustee in 1950. In June 1959, he was named president and chief executive officer. In 1969, he was named chairman and chief executive of Mutual Life while J. McCall Hughes became president.

Hull was "credited with devising his company's program for the lifetime compensation of agents in an effort to encourage men to make careers as insurance salesmen."

He was elected one of three public governors of the New York Stock Exchange in 1969, and was chairman of the American College of Life Underwriters. He had also served as chairman of the Life Insurance Association of America, a director of the Million Dollar Round Table, Academy of Political Science, the Health Insurance Institute, the New York Better Business Bureau, chairman of the Religion in American Life program, a member of the Salvation Army New York advisory board, a trustee the Atlantic Mutual Insurance Company, a trustee of the United Presbyterian Foundation and chairman of Billy Graham's 1957 New York Crusade.

== Personal life ==
In 1932, Hull was married to Rosalie Paschal, a daughter of John Jones Paschal and Rosa Lee (née Price) Paschal. He was the father of one son and two daughters:

- James Roger Hull Jr. (1937–2022), who served as minister of Broadway Presbyterian Church; he married Madelaine Judy Brown, a daughter of Dr. Harold Ogden Brown, in 1967.
- Rosemary Hull, who married David Morrill Mace, a son of Morrill Atwell Mace, in 1961.
- Elizabeth Paschal Hull (1941–2002), who married David Emerson Hall, a son of the Rev. Dr. Don Emerson Hall, in 1968.

Hull, who lived in Darien, Connecticut, died of cancer on February 6, 1972, at the Stamford Hospital in Stamford, Connecticut. His funeral was held at the Noroton Presbyterian Church in Darien, where he was an elder.
