= Charles Coffin Little =

American publisher (1799–1869)

- Born: July 25, 1799; Kennebunk, Massachusetts, U.S.
- Died: August 11, 1869 (aged 70); Cambridge, Massachusetts, U.S.
- Occupation: Publisher
- Known for: Co-founding Little, Brown and Company
- Children: Sarah Ellen Little
- Relatives: Richard Aldrich McCurdy (son-in-law)

Charles Coffin Little (July 25, 1799 – August 11, 1869) was an American publisher. He is best known for co-founding Little, Brown and Company with James Brown.

== Early life ==
Charles Coffin Little was born on July 25, 1799, in Kennebunk, Maine.

== Career ==
Little arrived in Boston early in life. He entered a shipping house, and around 1826–27 worked with booksellers Hilliard, Gray, Little & Wilkins in Boston, along with William Hilliard, Harrison Gray, and John H. Wilkins. He worked there until 1837, when he formed his partnership with James Brown under the style of Charles C. Little and Company. Little and Brown had previously been clerks, and were later partners, in a bookstore in Boston founded in 1784 by Ebenezer Battelle. The name of Little and Brown's firm was subsequently changed, due to the admission of other partners, to Little, Brown, and Co. Little was elected a member of the American Antiquarian Society in 1855.

== Personal life ==
Little's daughter, Sarah Ellen Little, married Richard Aldrich McCurdy.

== Death ==
Little died on August 11, 1869, in Cambridge, Massachusetts, aged 70.
