= Alexander Graham Bell honors and tributes =

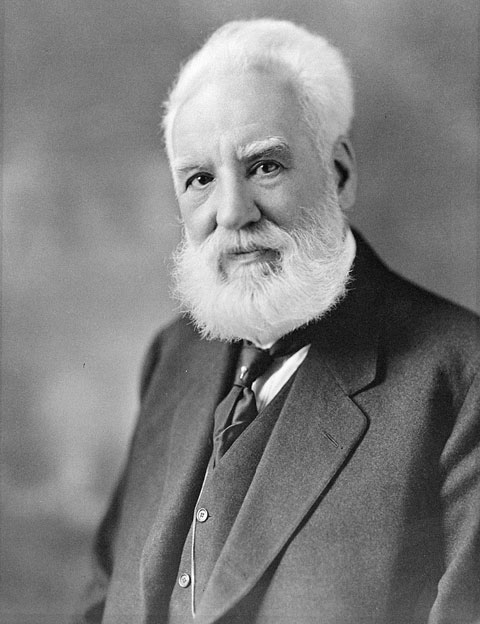
Alexander Graham Bell c.1918–1919

Alexander Graham Bell (March 3, 1847 – August 2, 1922) was an inventor, scientist, and engineer who received numerous honors and tributes during his life, and new awards were subsequently named for him posthumously.

== Major awards and tributes ==
Among those tributes:

- Chief George Henry Martin Johnson (Onwanonsyshon) of the aboriginal Six Nations Mohawk Reserve, near Bell's home in Brantford, Ontario, awarded him the title of Honorary Chief for his work in translating the unwritten Mohawk language into Visible Speech symbols (c. 1870);

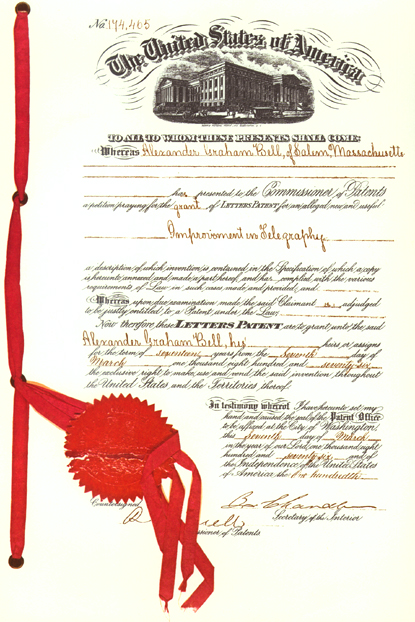
The master telephone patent, awarded to Bell in March 1876.

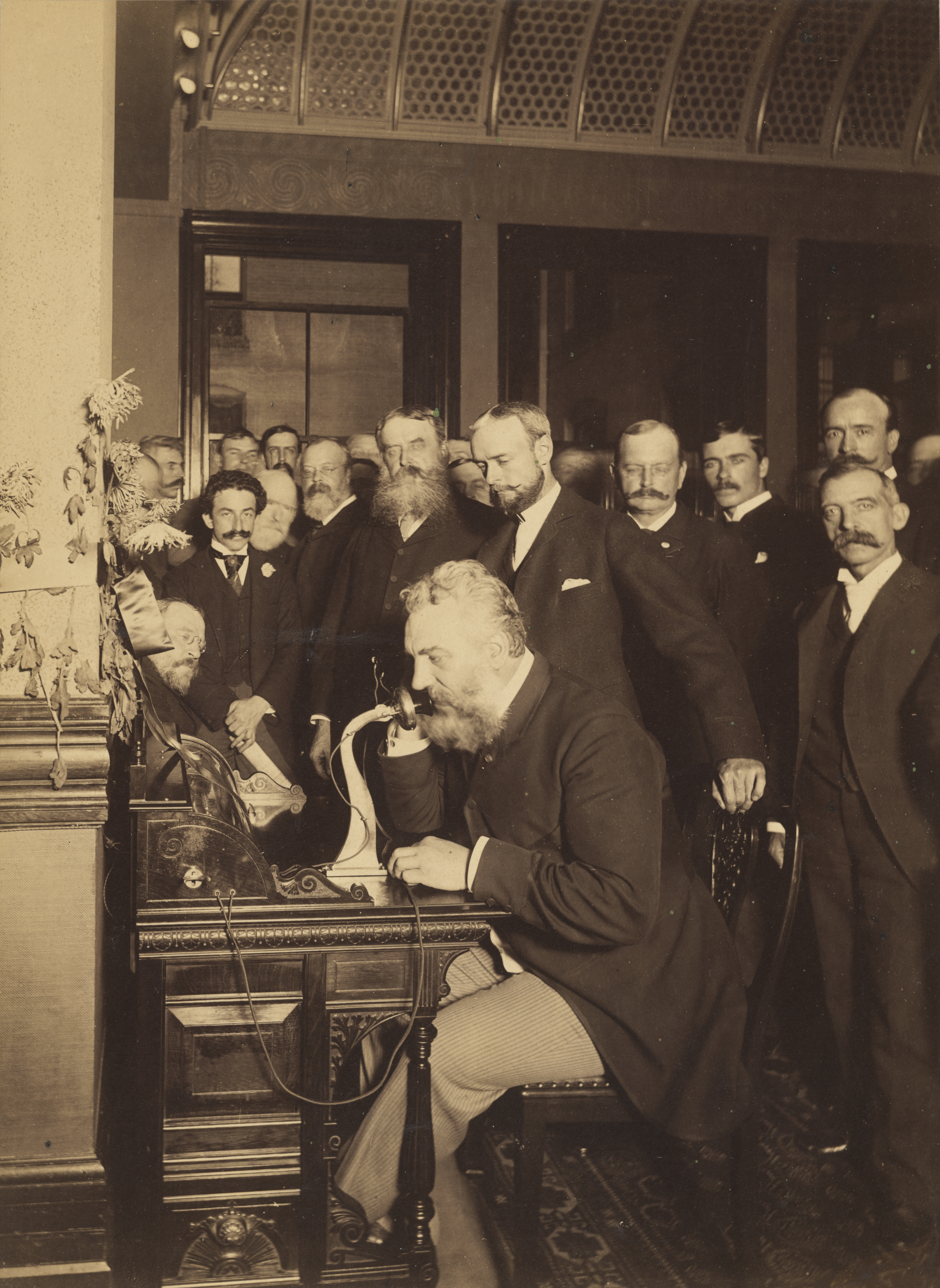
Bell ceremoniously inaugurating the New York to Chicago telephone line, 1892

- The National Association of Teachers of the Deaf elects Bell its president (1874);
- The United States Patent and Trademark Office awarded Bell the master telephone patent, No. 174,465, dated March 7, 1876. It becomes the foundation asset of the Bell Telephone Company, which later evolved into AT&T, at times the world's largest telephone company. The patent is considered by many to be the most valuable ever issued in history (1876);
- The U.S. Centennial Exposition in Philadelphia in June 1876, made Bell's newly created telephone a featured headline worldwide just a few months after it had been patented. Among the exhibition's judges were the notable Emperor Dom Pedro II of the Empire of Brazil and the eminent British physicist William Thomson (later made Lord Kelvin). Upon hearing Bell's voice through the telephone's receiver, the emperor reputedly exclaimed: "My God! It talks!" Thomson described the telephone as "the greatest by far of all the marvels of the electric telegraph". Thomson and Emperor Pedro, who was equally amazed that the telephone could 'speak' in Portuguese, later recommended the device to the Committee of Electrical Awards, which voted Bell its Gold Medal for Electrical Equipment. Bell also won a second Gold Medal for his additional display of Visible Speech at the exposition, and further won an order of 100 telephones from Emperor Pedro for his country. Ironically, Bell—then occupied full-time as both a private teacher and as a professor at Boston University—hadn't planned on attending the exhibition due to his heavy work schedule, and left Boston only at the last moment to attend the exposition at the stern insistence of his then-fiance and future wife Mabel Hubbard, aged 18. Dom Pedro's chance viewing of the invention at the fair was pivotal to the awards and world headlines Bell earned, helping the telephone gain public acceptance (1876);
- The American Academy of Arts and Sciences elected Bell a Fellow of the Academy (1877);
- Bell received the James Watt silver medal for the telephone from the Royal Cornwall Polytechnic Society (1877);
- The Massachusetts Charitable Mechanic Association (a.k.a. the Association of the Mechanics of Boston) awarded two gold medals to Bell, as exhibitor #626 registered to the New England Telephone Company of Boston, MA, for both the telephone and Visible Speech, twinning the results of the Centennial Exposition held in Philadelphia two years earlier (1878);
- The Society of Arts in London awards him his first Royal Albert medal, a silver, for his paper on the telephone (1878);
- The Third Paris World's Fair, called the Exposition Universelle, awarded Bell (along with Elisha Gray and Thomas Edison) a Grand Prize for the telephone (1878);
- Gallaudet College, earlier chartered as the Columbia Institution Of The Deaf, and at the time called the National Deaf-Mute College, of Washington, D.C., awarded Bell an Honorary Ph.D. 'in recognition of his work for the Deaf' (1880).
- The French Academy, representing the French government, awarded Bell the Volta Prize with a purse of 50,000 francs (approximately $10,000) for the invention of the telephone (1880). Since Bell was becoming increasingly affluent, he used his prize money to create endowment funds (the 'Volta Fund') and institutions in and around the United States capital of Washington, D.C. They included the prestigious 'Volta Laboratory Association' (1880), also known as the 'Volta Laboratory' and as the 'Alexander Graham Bell Laboratory', as well as creating the Volta Bureau (1887) as a center for studies on deafness. The Volta Laboratory became a permanently funded experimental facility devoted to scientific discovery, and the very next year invented a wax phonograph cylinder that was later used by Thomas Edison;
- The President of the Third French Republic, Jules Grévy, on the recommendation of his Minister of Foreign Affairs Jules Barthélemy-Saint-Hilaire and with the presentations of the Minister of Posts and Telegraphs Louis Cochery, designated Bell with the distinction of an 'Officer Of The Legion of Honour' (Légion d'honneur) by decree on 10 November 1881, in recognition of his inventions (1881);
Decree awarding Helmholtz, Bell, and Edison, the Legion of Honour

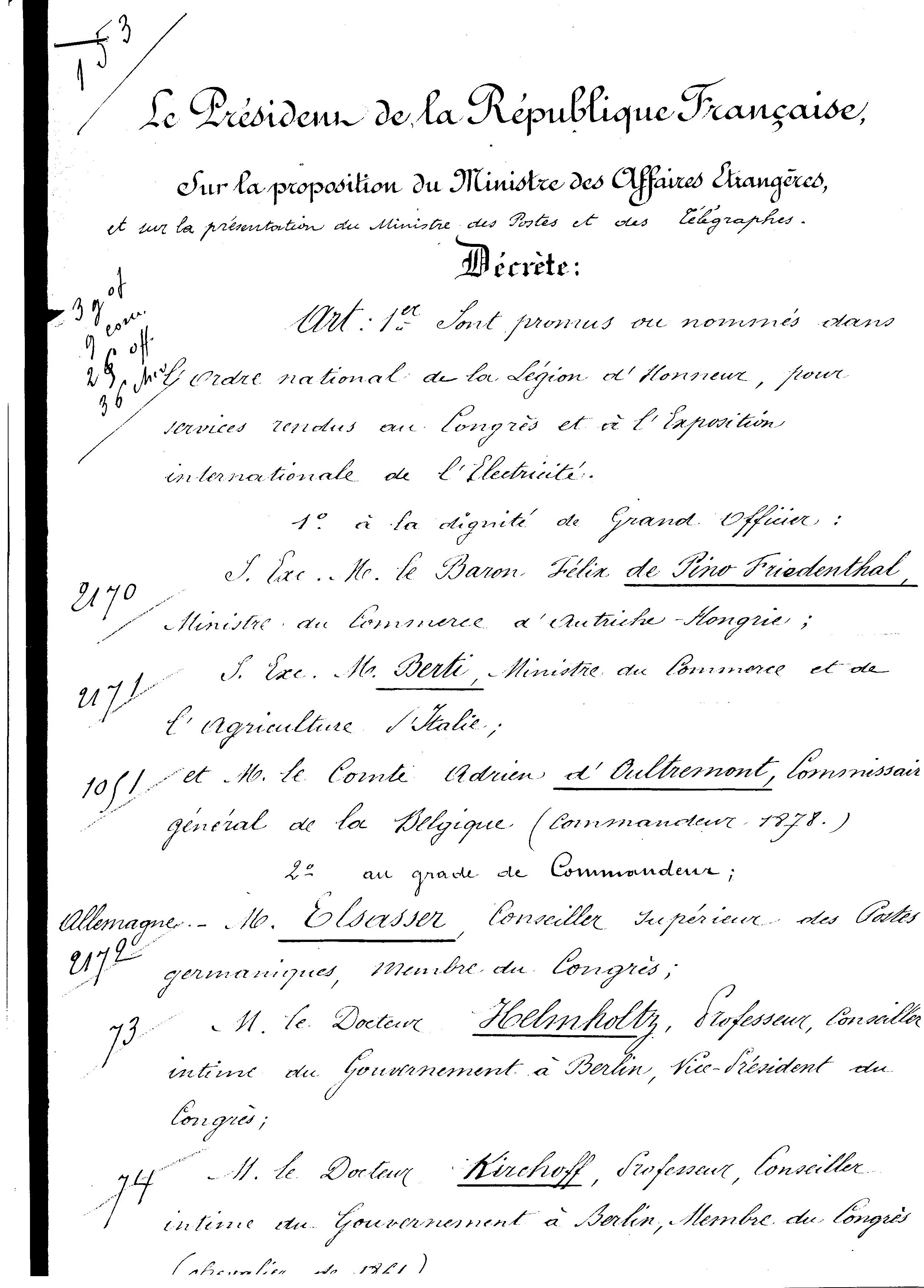

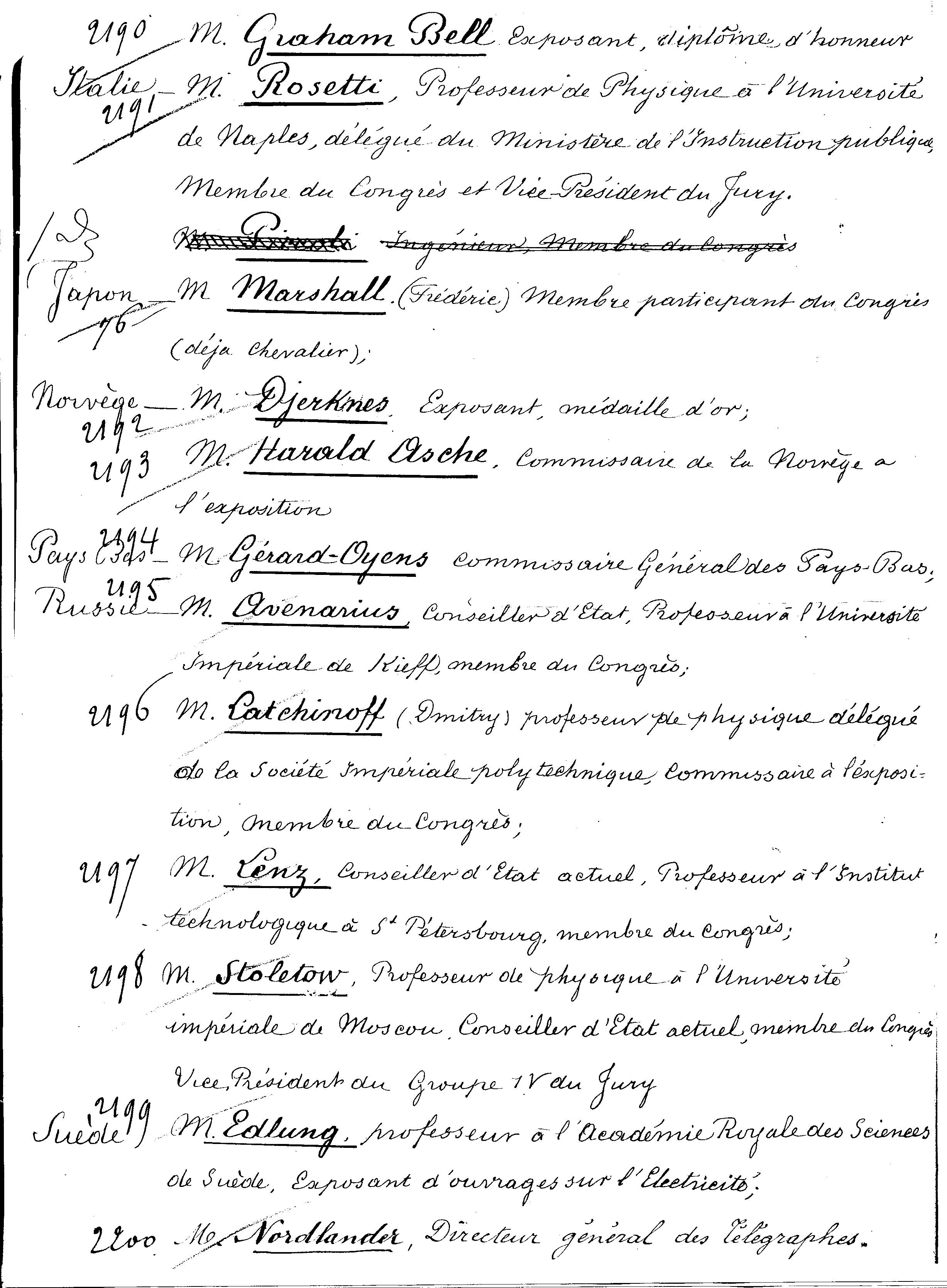

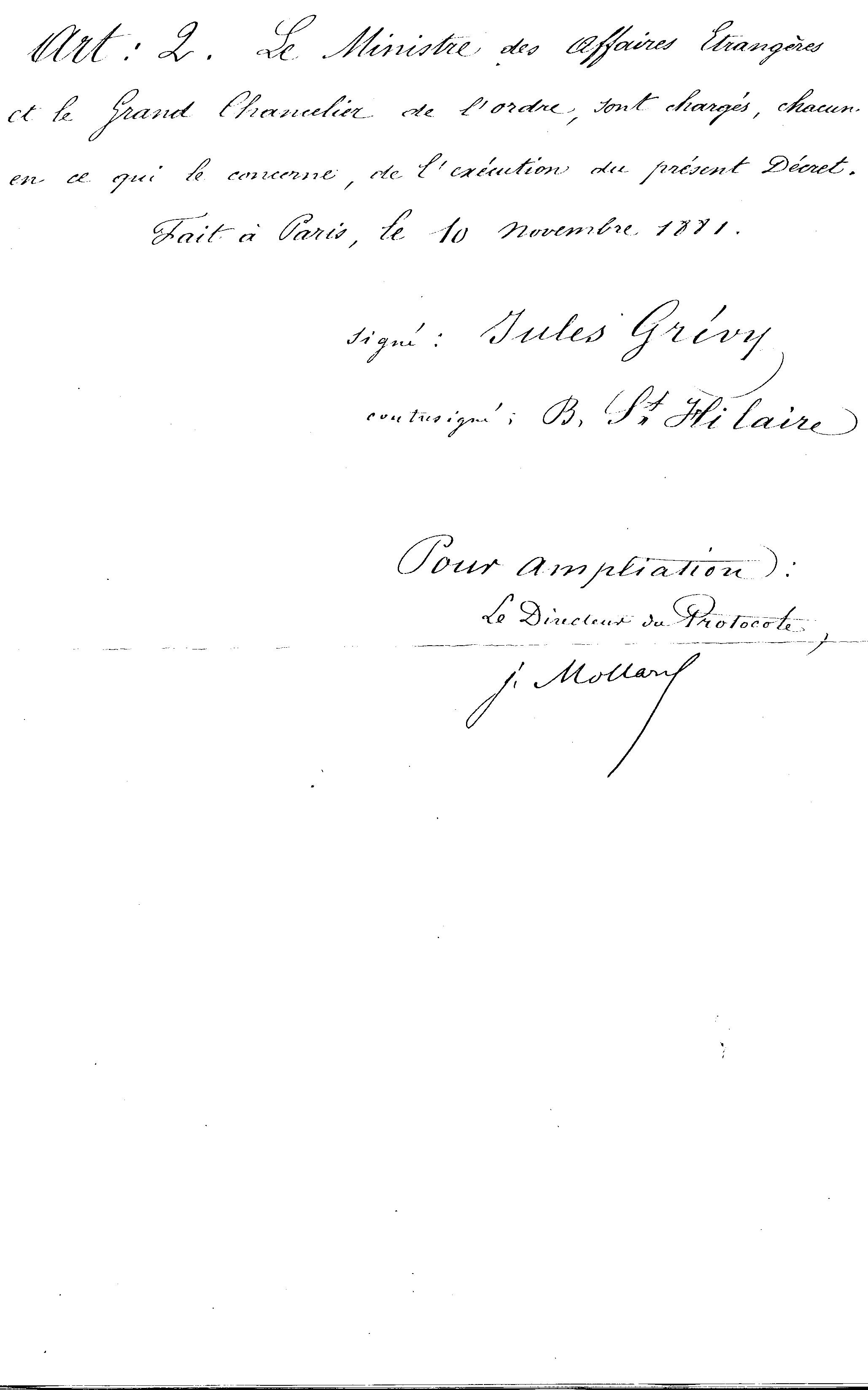
- The Society of Arts issues their second Royal Albert silver medal to him for his paper on his proudest achievement, the Photophone, invented a year earlier (1881);

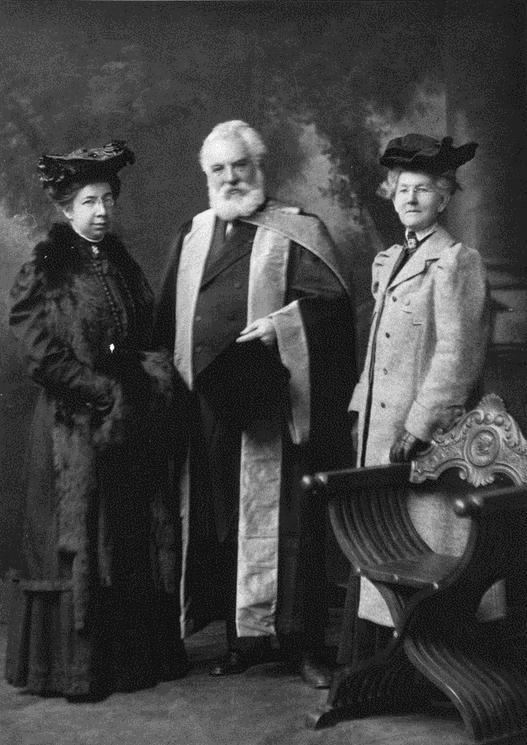
Bell receiving an honorary Doctor of Laws degree, University of Edinburgh, 1906.

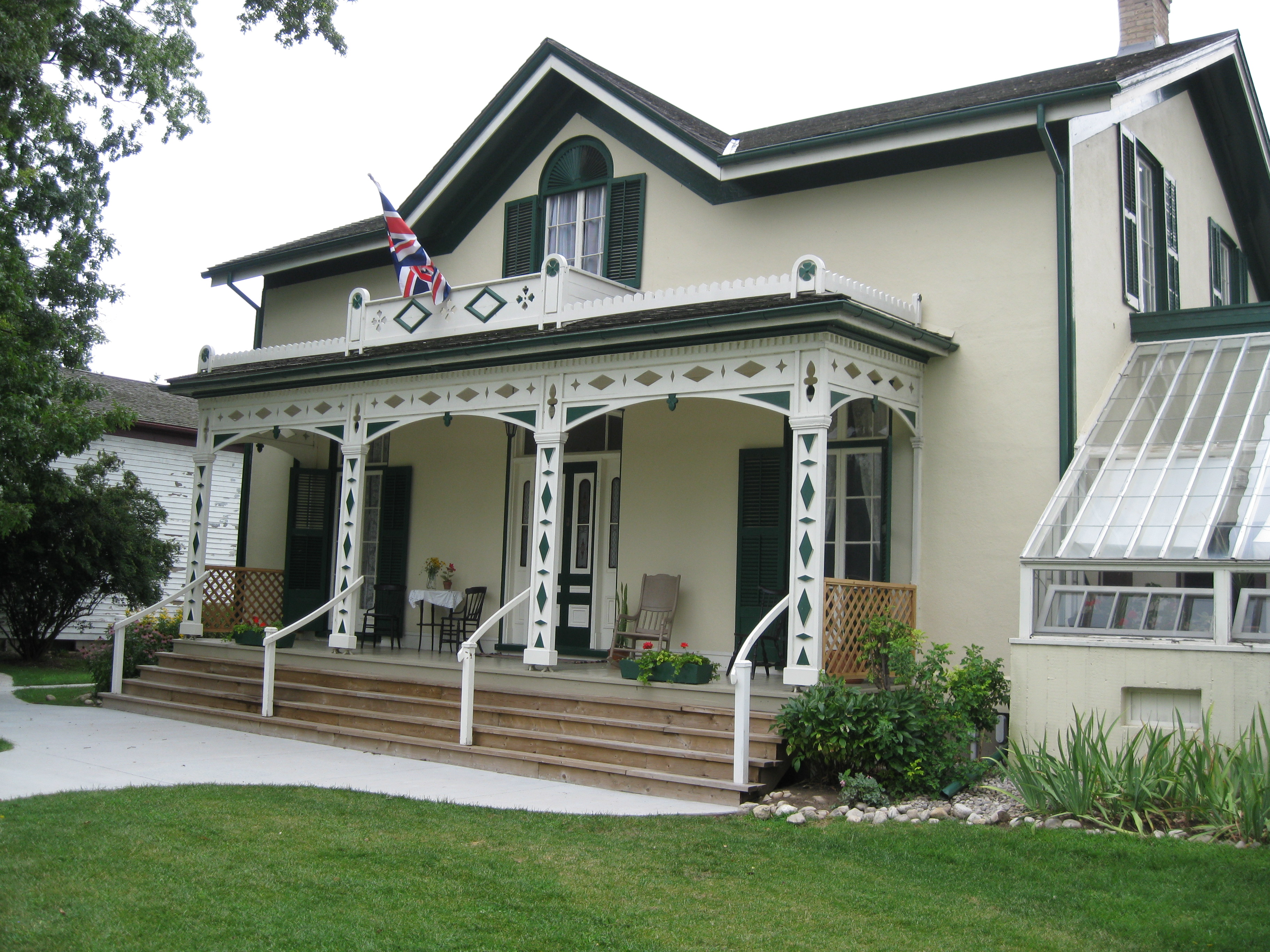
Melville House at the Bell Homestead National Historic Site, his first home in Canada, opened as a museum in 1910 in Brantford, Ontario.

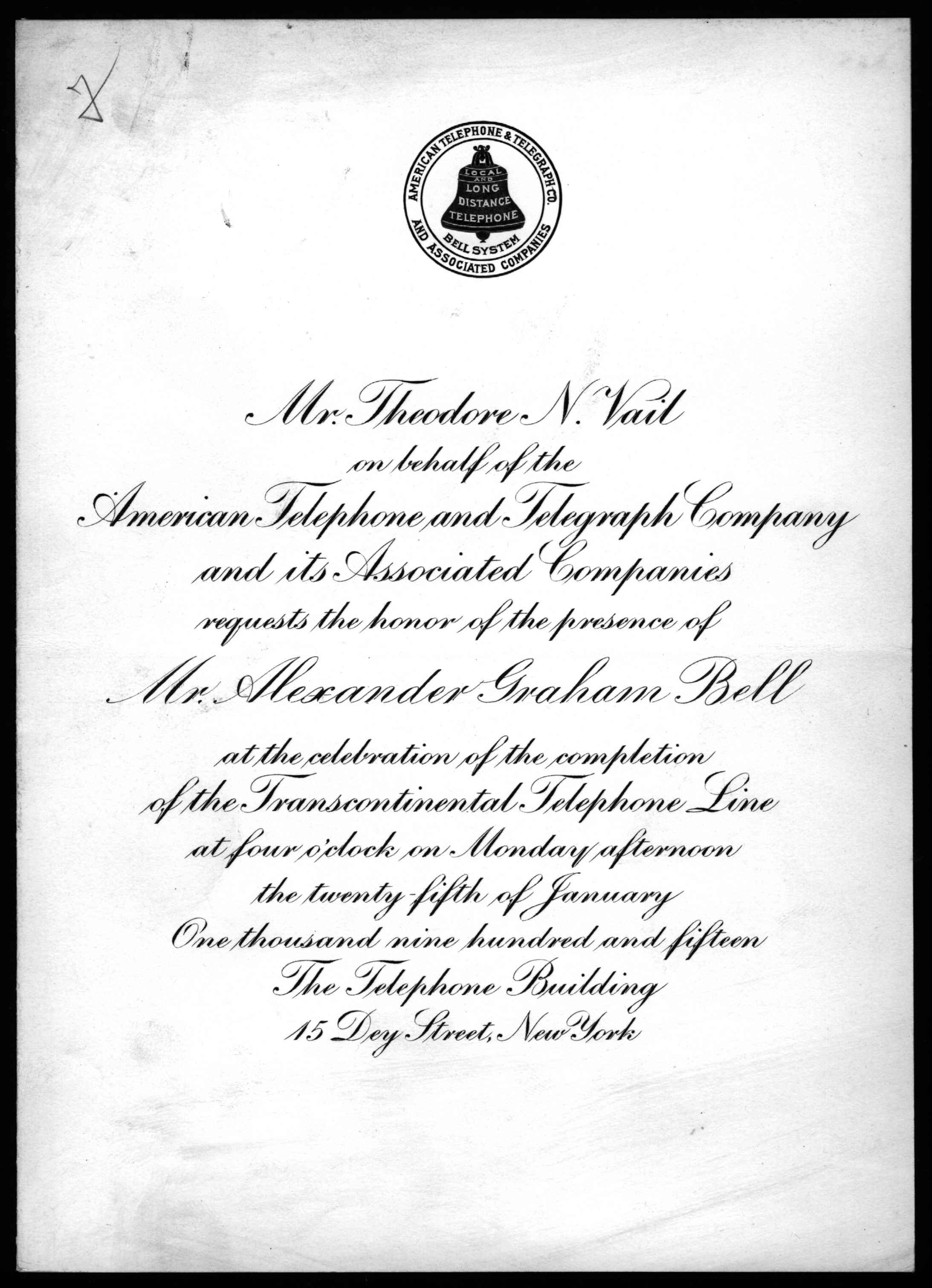
Invitation to Bell to inaugurate the first U.S. transcontinental telephone line, 1915.

- The University of Würzburg, Bavaria granted Bell an honorary (Ph.D.) (1882).
- The American Philosophical Society elected Bell as a member (1882).
- The National Academy of Sciences elected Bell as a member (1883);
- The American Institute of Electrical Engineers, predecessor of the Institute of Electrical and Electronics Engineers elected Bell as one of its founding vice presidents, and later elevated him to its president (1884, and president 1891–1892);
- The Rupert Charles University of Heidelberg, Germany awarded him an Honorary Doctor of Medicine degree, for Bell's invention of an ultrasound metal detector, used in a bid to save the life of President James Abram Garfield (1886).
- The American Institute of Electrical Engineers (AIEE) appointed Bell its president (1891–1892);
- Harvard University granted him an honorary Doctor of Laws degrees (LL.D.) (1896);
- Illinois College awarded him an LL.D. degree (1896): N.B.: there are two different years cited for this degree –the college's data is shown.
- The National Geographic Society appointed him President (1898–1903).
- The United States Senate granted him several appointments as a regent of the world famous Smithsonian Institution (1898–1924);
- The Washington Academy of Sciences, founded by a group of scientists which included Samuel Langley, Secretary of the Smithsonian Institution, elected Bell its President (c.1900);
- The U.S. Census Bureau appointed him a special agent to the bureau in order to determine the extent of the Twelfth Census that applied to the deaf of the United States (1900);
- The Society of Arts of London, England, awarded him the Albert Medal for his invention of the telephone (1902).
- St Andrew's University awarded Bell a Doctor of Philosophy degree (Ph. D.) (1902).
- The University of Edinburgh granted him an honorary Doctor of Laws degree (1906);
- Oxford University granted him an honorary Doctor of Science degree (D.Sc./Sc.D.) (1906).
- The American Association of Engineering Societies awarded him the John Fritz Medal (1907).
- Bell and the other four members of the Aerial Experiment Association are awarded the Scientific American Prize for the First public airplane flight greater than one kilometer in the United States (1908);
- Queen's University in Kingston, Ontario, presented an honorary Doctor of Laws degrees (LL.D.) to him (1909).
- The Bell Homestead Museum, part of the Bell Homestead National Historic Site in Brantford, Ontario, was the Bell family's first home in North America and the site where Bell invented the telephone in the July 1874. Bell's parents and extended family lived on the 10-acre site for 11 years, with the homestead being sold when his parents moved to Washington, D.C., to join their son. The museum was opened to the public in 1910. The farm, carriage house and its principal building, Melville House were earlier obtained from its last private owner by the Bell Telephone Memorial Association in 1909. Its rooms were restored to their original condition and many of its furnishings are original Bell possessions. The site also later added the Henderson Home, Canada's first telephone company office opened in 1877 and a predecessor of Bell Canada, which was moved to the museum from its original location in downtown Brantford. In the present day the museum is operated by the Bell Homestead Society, and has been designated a National Historic Site of Canada (1910).
- Upon its inception at its first meeting on November 2, 1911, in Boston, the fraternal Telephone Pioneers of America organization made Bell its first charter member. The organization has since grown to more than 600,000 individuals (1911).
- The Franklin Institute awarded Bell the Elliott Cresson Medal in the field of Engineering for "Electrical Transmission of Articulate Speech" (1912).
- George Washington University awarded him an Honorary Degree (1913).
- The Royal Society awarded him the David Edward Hughes Medal for 'an original discovery in the physical sciences, particularly electricity and magnetism or their applications', citing Bell "...for his share in the invention of the telephone, and more especially the construction of the telephone receiver" (1913).
- Dartmouth College awarded Bell an honorary Doctor of Laws degree (1913);
- The Institute of Electrical and Electronics Engineers awarded him the Thomas Alva Edison Medal "for a career of meritorious achievement in electrical science, electrical engineering or the electrical arts" (1914).
- Bell, the celebrity, in New York, ceremonially inaugurated the United States' first transcontinental telephone system with a widely reported telephone call to his former assistant Thomas Watson in San Francisco, during which Watson quipped to Bell that he could hear him "much better now" (1915);
- Dr. John H. Finley, founder of the Junior American Red Cross and New York State Commissioner of Education, presented Bell with the Civic Forum Medal of Honor for Distinguished Public Service at Carnegie Hall (1917);
- The Governor General of Canada, Victor Cavendish, 9th Duke of Devonshire, unveiled the Bell Telephone Memorial (photo below) erected in Bell's honor in The Telephone City's (Brantford, ON) Alexander Graham Bell Gardens as part of the City of Brantford's public parks system (1917).

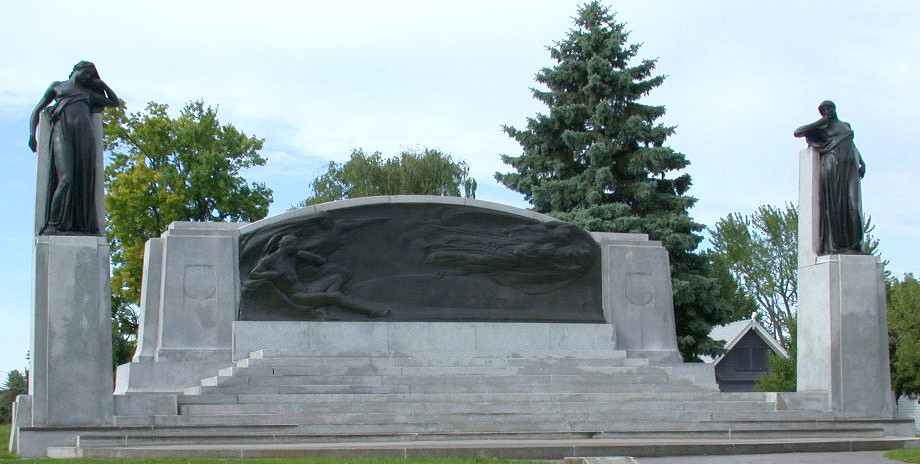
The Bell Telephone Memorial, commemorating the invention of the telephone by Alexander Graham Bell. The monument, paid by public subscription and sculpted by W.S. Allward, was dedicated by the Governor General of Canada, Victor Cavendish, 9th Duke of Devonshire with Dr. Bell in The Telephone City's Alexander Graham Bell Gardens in 1917. Included on the main tableau are figures representing Man, the inventor, Inspiration whispering to Man, his power to transmit sound through space, as well as Knowledge, Joy, and Sorrow. (Courtesy: Brantford Heritage Inventory, City of Brantford, Ontario, Canada)

- Bell inaugurates the Alexander Graham Bell School in Chicago, Illinois. The elementary school was founded in 1917 with 24 classrooms for hearing students and 15 classrooms for deaf students, after the Chicago School Board allocated US$285,000 for it in 1915 (approximately $9,070,000 in current dollars). The school, one of the largest built in the Chicago Public School system at the time, was opened one year earlier. (1918);
- The City of Edinburgh made him a Burgess and honored Bell with its Freedom of The City award during his final "farewell visit" to Europe (1920). He was being accompanied by his wife Mabel, and his granddaughter and secretary Mabel H. Grosvenor.

== Other citations, honours and awards ==
- Bell received numerous other awards and honorary degrees during his life. Among them were:
  - Doctor of Philosophy degree (Ph. D.) from Illinois College in recognition for his work for the deaf. Note that this may be an erroneous item, as the College's website only lists a single degree to Bell ––his LL.D in 1896.
  - Doctor of Laws degree (LL.D.) from Amherst College;
- Bell additionally received the Karl Koenig von Württemberg gold medal;
- At the age of eighteen, Bell was nominated for membership in the scholarly London Philological Society, by linguist and mathematician Alexander Ellis, on the basis of a study Bell had written on overtones. Ellis also lent him a work by German scientist Hermann von Helmholtz, with Bell's incorrect translation of that work becoming the basis of his enduring research into transmitting speech telephonic-ally (1865);
- Bell was also nominated as a Resident Member of the Boston Society of Natural History (1876).

== Other posthumous tributes ==
- Upon Bell's death, during his burial, "....every phone on the continent of North America was silenced in honor of the man who had given to mankind the means for direct communication at a distance" ;
- When he heard of his death, Canadian Prime Minister Mackenzie King cabled Mrs. Bell, saying:

"[The Government expresses] to you our sense of the world's loss in the death of your distinguished husband. It will ever be a source of pride to our country that the great invention, with which his name is immortally associated, is a part of its history. On the behalf of the citizens of Canada, may I extend to you an expression of our combined gratitude and sympathy."

- U.S. President Warren Harding also telegram Mrs. Bell, saying:

"The announcement of your eminent husband's death comes a great shock to me. In common with all of his countrymen, I have learned to revere him as one of the great benefactors.... and among the foremost Americans of all generations. He will be mourned and honored by human kind everywhere as one who served it greatly, untiringly and usefully"

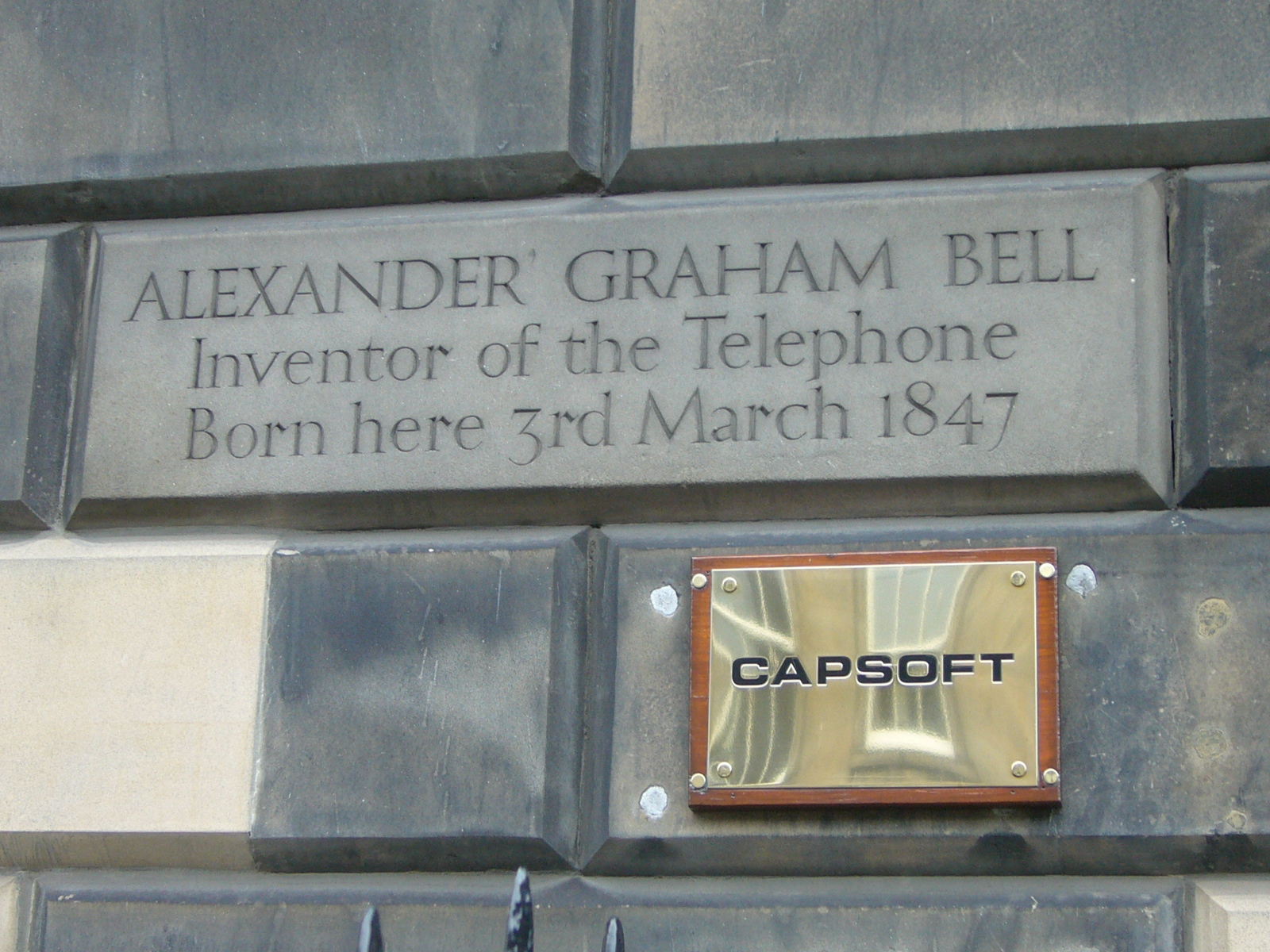
Inscribed marker at Bell's birthplace in Edinburgh, Scotland.

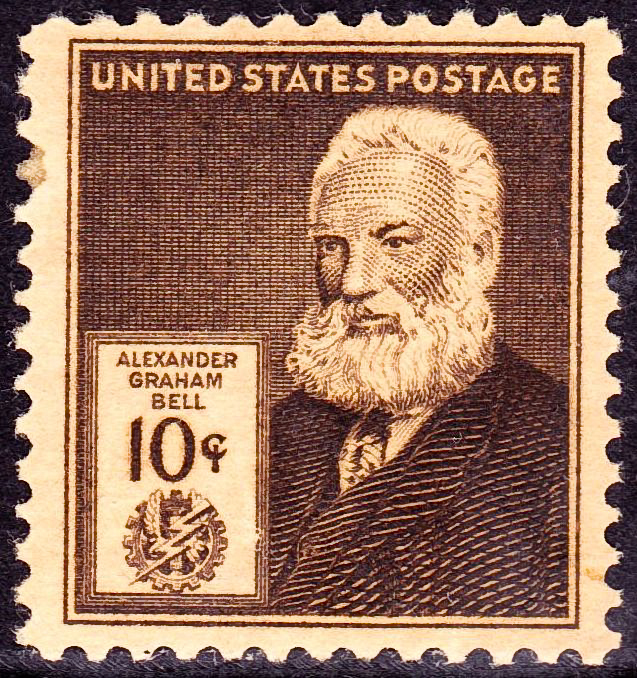
A.G. Bell US postage stamp issue of 1940

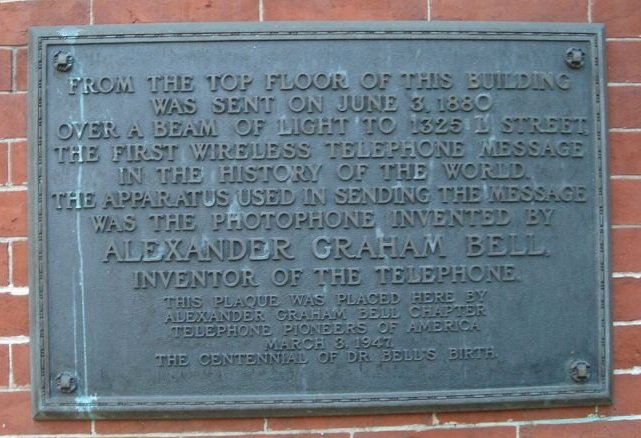
Historical plaque marker in Washington, D.C., marks one of the sites used by Bell and Tainter's Photophone.

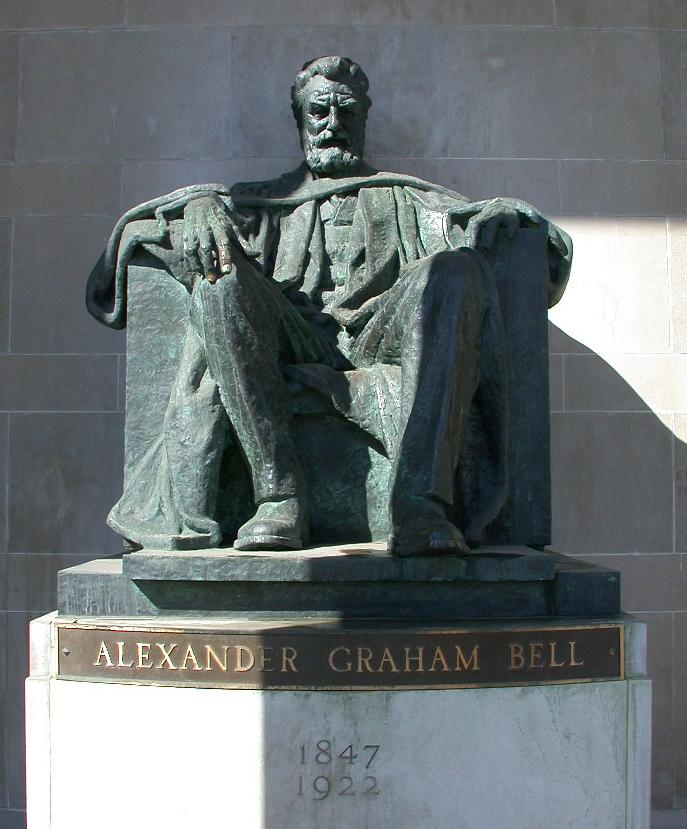
Bell statue dedicated in 1949, in the front portico of the Bell Telephone Building of Brantford, Ontario.

A My Fair Lady movie poster, in which Bell's works are quoted. The inspiration for the Professor Higgins character was Bell's father Alexander Melville Bell, who was introduced by Melville's brother to playwright George Bernard Shaw.

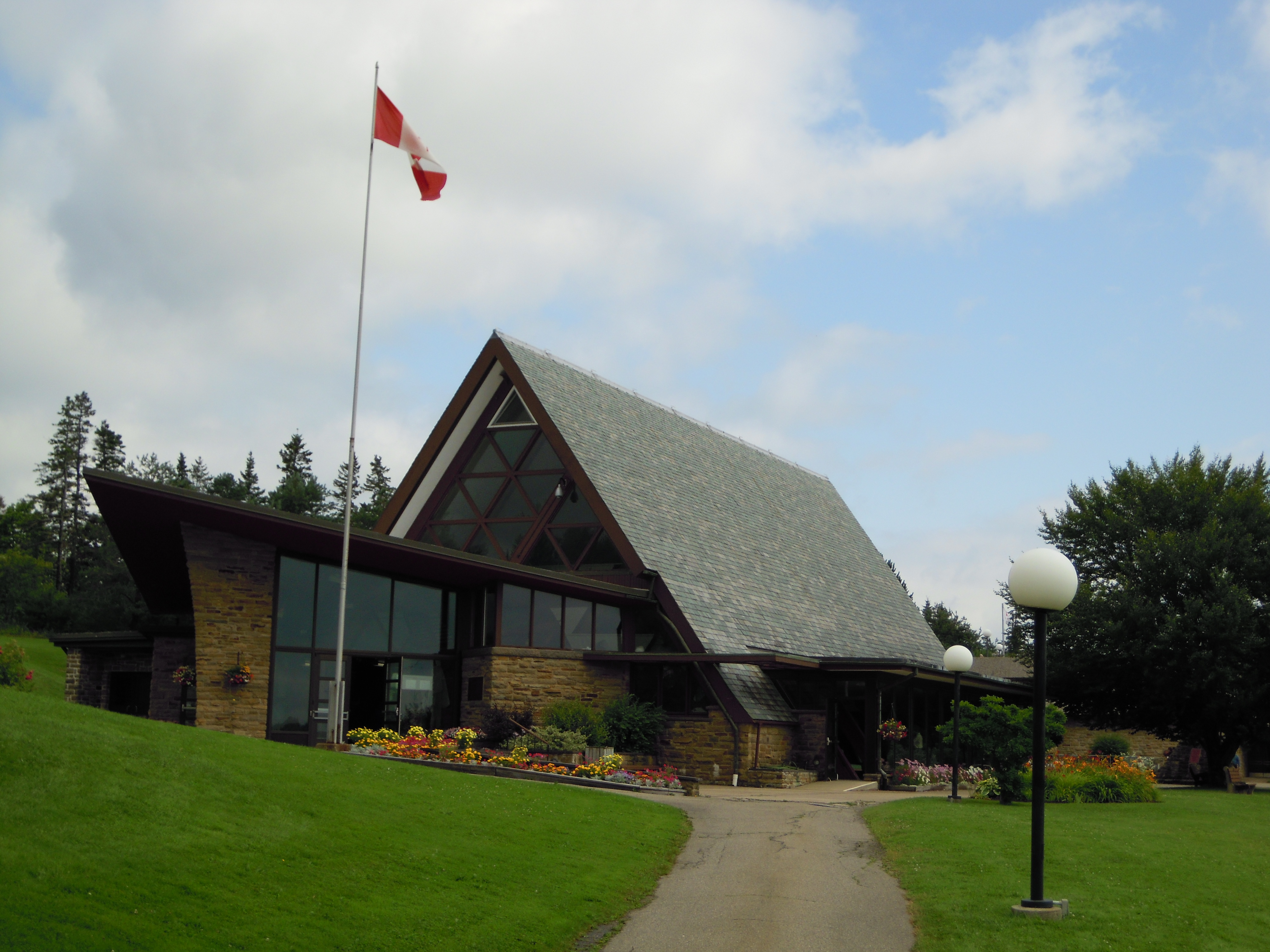
Alexander Graham Bell National Historic Site and Museum, opened in 1956 in Baddeck, Nova Scotia, near to the Bells' private estate and burial site.

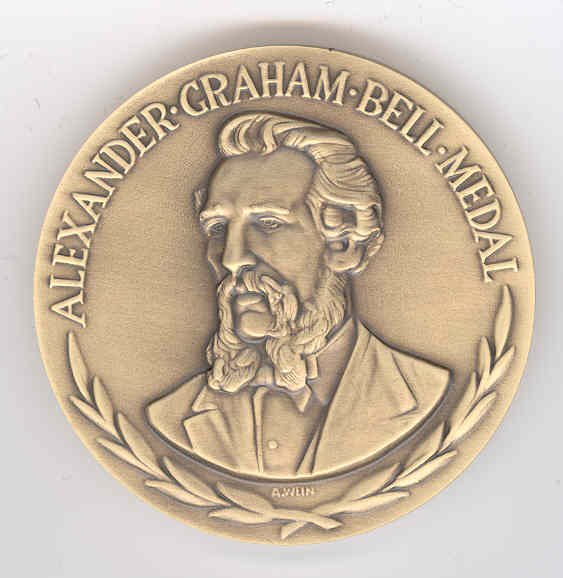
The IEEE Alexander Graham Bell Medal, for meritorious achievements in telecommunications. (Photo courtesy: IEEE)

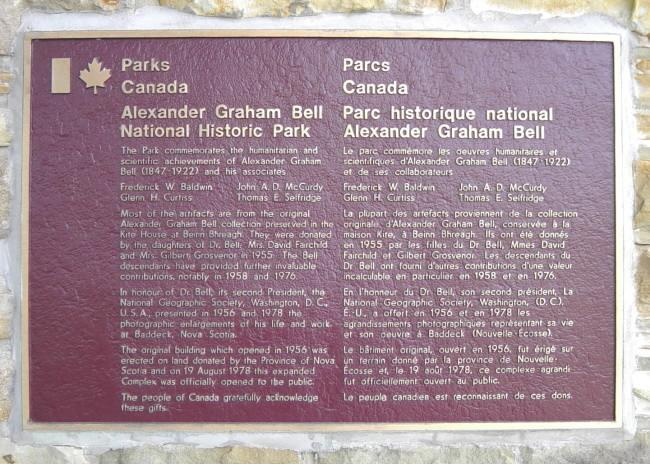
Parks Canada plaque at the Alexander Graham Bell National Historic Park, Baddeck, Nova Scotia, adjacent to the A.G. Bell Museum on the same site

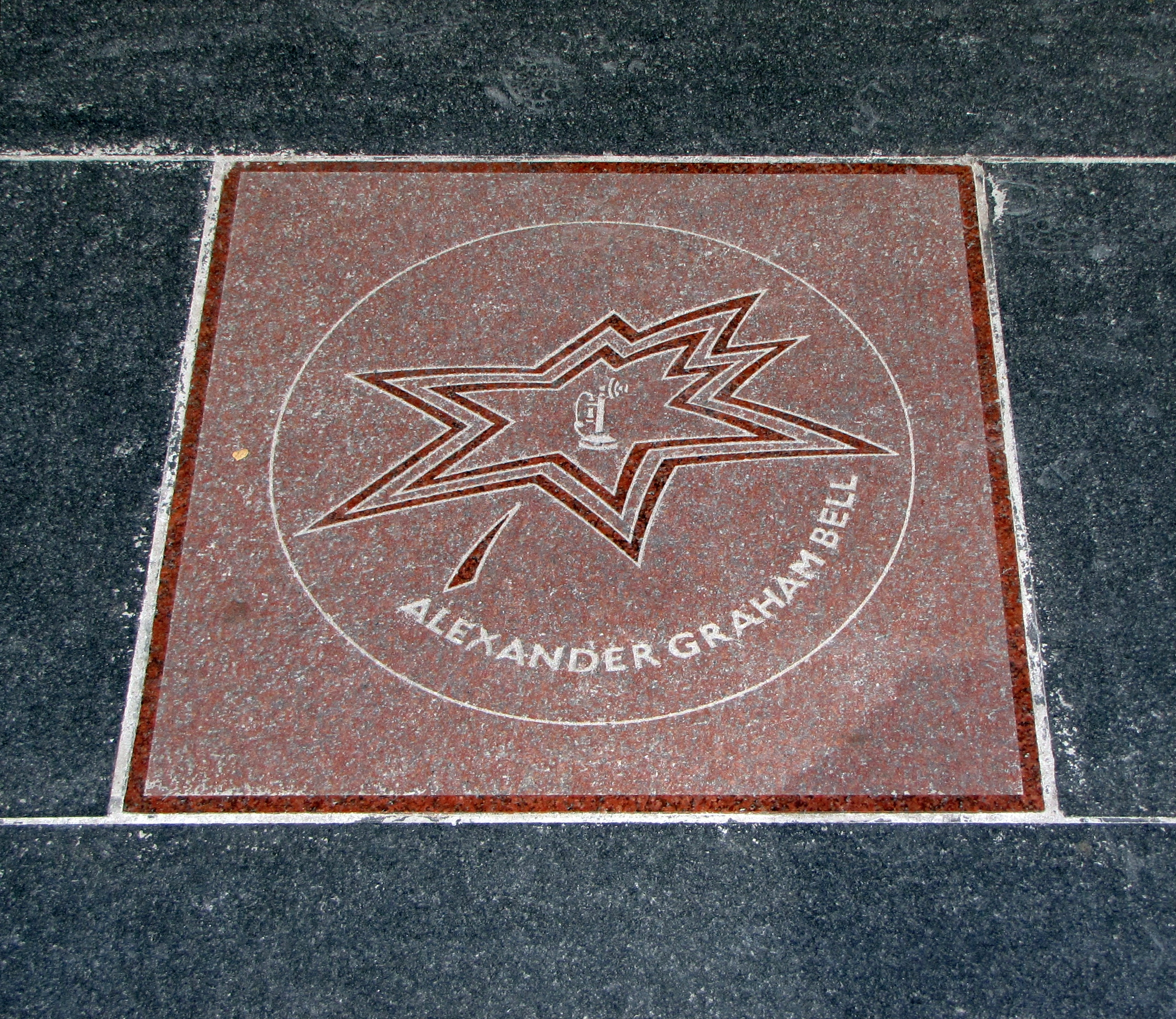
The Walk of Fame 'Bell Star' on Toronto's Simcoe Street

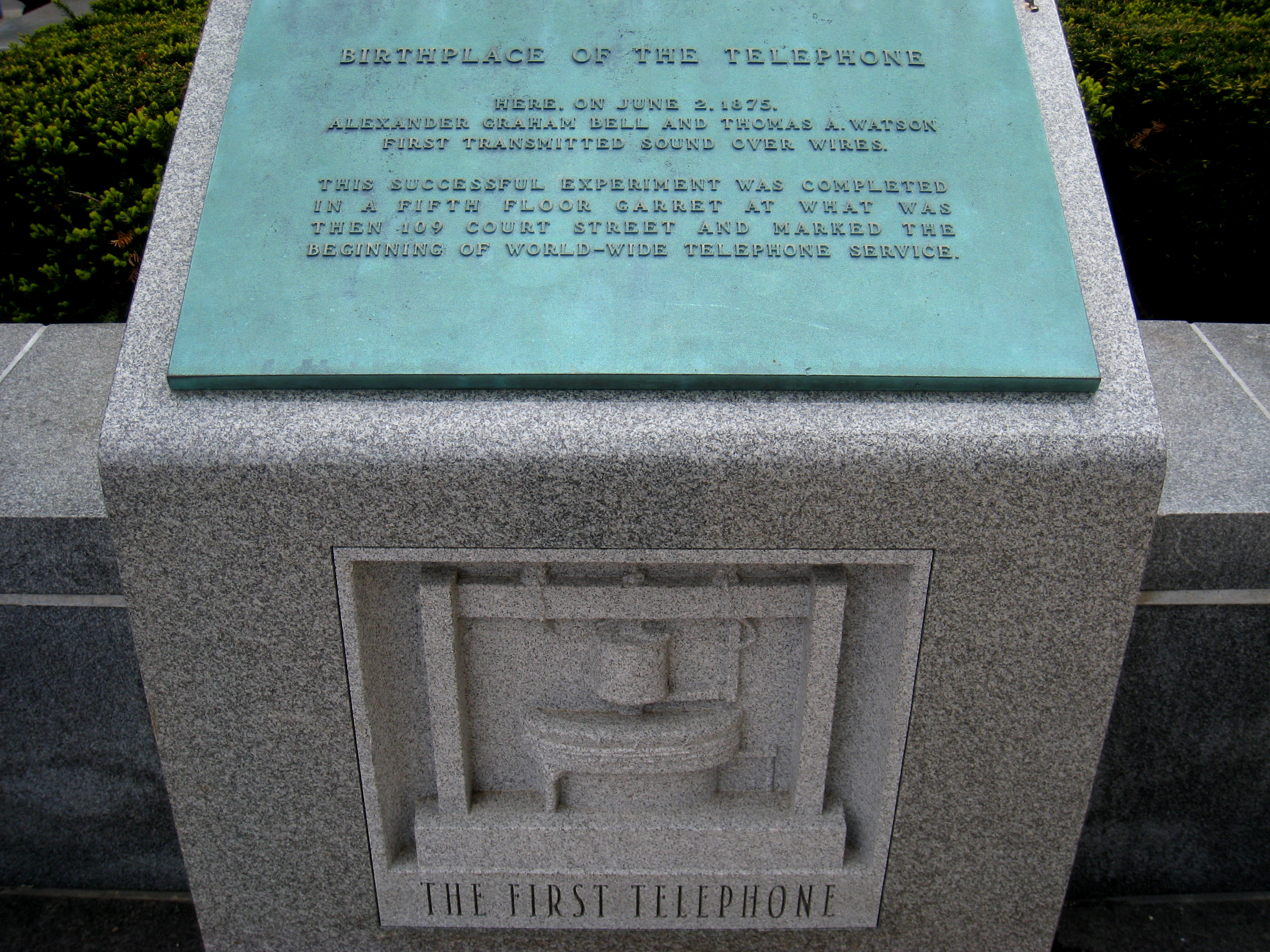
Commemorative marker at 109 Court Street in Boston, where Bell and Watson transmitted their first harmonic 'twang' in 1875.

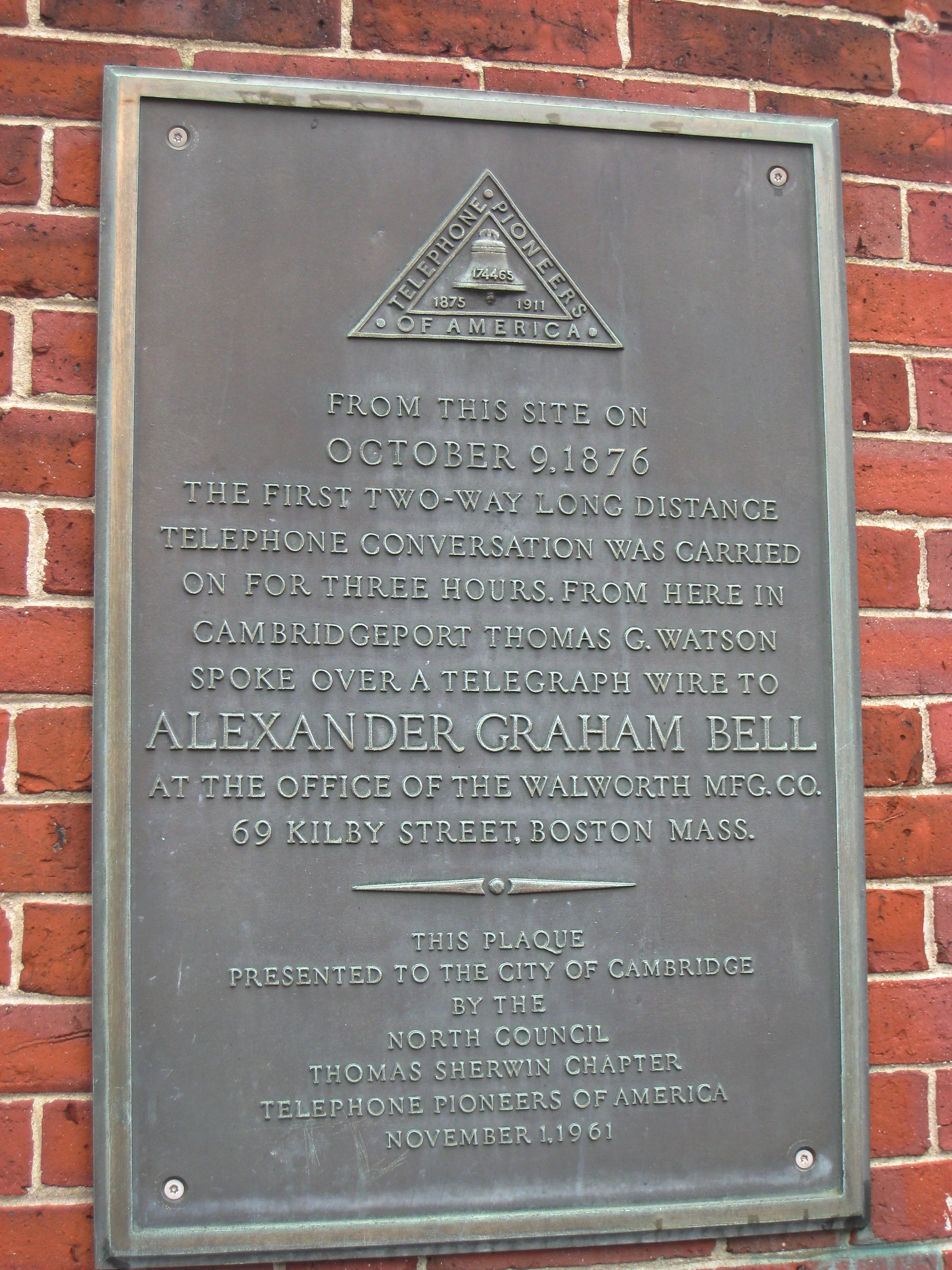
Cambridge, MA plaque commemorating a three hour telephone conversation by Watson, with Bell in Boston, on October 9, 1876.

- A large number of Bell's writings, notebooks, papers and other documents were established at the United States Library of Congress Manuscript Division, as the Alexander Graham Bell Family Papers. The collection is currently available for online viewing;
- Another large collection of Bell's documents reside at the Alexander Graham Bell Institute at Cape Breton University, Nova Scotia;
- The US Patent Office declared Bell first on its list of the country's greatest inventors (1936);
- The bel (B), and the smaller decibel (dB), units of measure of sound intensity were invented by the Bell Labs, and were named in his honor. The units are widely used in science, technology and engineering (1937);
- The United States Post Office Department issued a 10 cent commemorative postage stamp of Bell, part of its 'Famous Americans Series' of 1940. This particular stamp was so popular it sold out in little time and became, and is to this day, the most valuable stamp in that series.
- The US Merchant Marine ship S.S. Alexander Graham Bell (hull #583) was launched and commissioned for service in the Second World War (18 October 1942);
- The Telephone Pioneers of America dedicated a plaque on the wall of the Franklin School at 13th & K Streets NW in Washington, D.C., honoring Bell's invention of the Photophone, the precursor of fibre-optical communications, and which he referred to as his 'greatest invention'. The plaque read:

"From the top floor of this building • Was sent on June 3, 1880 • Over a beam of light to 1325 'L' Street • The first wireless telephone message • In the history of the world. • The apparatus used in sending the message • Was the Photophone invented by • Alexander Graham Bell • inventor of the telephone • This plaque was placed here by • Alexander Graham Bell Chapter • Telephone Pioneers of America..."; (1947)

- The Charles Fleetford Sise Chapter of the Telephone Pioneers of America commissioned and dedicated a large statue of Bell in the front portico of Brantford, Ontario's new Bell Telephone Building plant on Market Street. The Pioneers raised over $5,000 across North America for the work in 1948–1949 (more than $67000 in current dollars). Attending the formal ceremony were Bell's daughter, Mrs. Gillbert Grosvenor, Frederick Johnson, President of the Bell Telephone Company of Canada, T.N. Lacy, President of the Telephone Pioneers, and Brantford Mayor Walter J. Dowden. The statue had been designed and crafted by A.E. Cleeve Horne in his Toronto studio in the style of the Lincoln Memorial, and cast in bronze in New York. Pioneers president T.N. Lacy spoke at the unveiling comparing the Cleeve Horne work to the Lincoln Memorial in Washington, saying that sculptor "....has accomplished in this memorial to Alexander Graham Bell what Daniel Chester French created for the Lincoln Memorial... ...he has caught and reflected the conviction that Bell, like Lincoln, was an emancipator... [He] gave freedom and range to the human voice." On each side of the monument is the engraved inscription, "In Grateful Recognition of the Inventor of the Telephone". Its dedication was broadcast nationally by the Canadian Broadcasting Corporation (17 June 1949)
- The Hall of Fame for Great Americans inducted Bell by 70 votes (1950);
- The Canadian Government also established the Alexander Graham Bell National Historic Site of Canada, which also includes the Alexander Graham Bell Museum, in Baddeck, Nova Scotia (1952);
- The Salem, MA Essex Institute presented a plaque (originally dedicated in 1922) honoring Alexander Graham Bell and his financial supporters Thomas and Mary Ann Brown Sanders to the New England Telephone and Telegraph Company, located on Essex Street on the YMCA Building (1958);
- At the age of 19, Bell wrote a report on his studies of tuning fork resonance and sent it to philologist Alexander Ellis, a colleague of his father. Ellis would later be portrayed as Professor Henry Higgins in George Bernard Shaw's famous play, Pygmalion, in 1913. Pygmalion was later adapted into the Oscar Award-winning movie My Fair Lady, where in hommage to Bell's work teaching the deaf to speak, the movie's central character, Prof. Higgins (played by famed actor Rex Harrison) refers to the use of "Bell's Visible Speech" (1964).
- The National Aviation Hall of Fame (NAHF) enshrined him as a member for his extensive pioneering research in aeronautics (1965);
- The International Astronomical Union (IAU) named a crater on the moon Bell, in his honor (1970);
- Canada Post released an eight cent commemorative issue stamp on July 26, 1974, honouring the centenary of the invention of the telephone at Bell's parent's home, Melville House, now called the Bell Homestead National Historic Site. The stamp feature's three phones: a (then) modern Contempra telephone by Nortel, a much earlier daffodil phone, plus Bell's very earliest experimental model of 1875, the Gallows telephone (1974);
- The National Inventors Hall of Fame (NIHF) inducted Bell as a member, describing his works: ...Bell's inventive genius is represented only in part by the 18 patents granted in his name alone and the 12 he shared with his collaborators. These included 14 for the telephone and telegraph, four for the photophone, one for the phonograph, five for aerial vehicles, four for hydroairplanes, and two for a selenium cell (1974);
- The IEEE Alexander Graham Bell Medal was created in his honor by the Institute of Electrical and Electronics Engineers (currently sponsored by Alcatel-Lucent's Bell Labs), to annually award outstanding contributions in the field of telecommunications (1976);
- Parks Canada dedicates the a park as part of the Alexander Graham Bell National Historic Site in Baddeck, Nova Scotia, which contains the Alexander Graham Bell Museum opened earlier in 1956, not far from Bell's estate, Beinn Bhreagh (1976);
- The Royal Bank of Scotland issued a £1 commemorative banknote to mark the 150th Anniversary of the birth of Alexander Graham Bell. The illustrations on the reverse of the note include Bell's face in profile, his signature, and objects from Bell's life and career: users of the telephone over the ages; an audio wave signal; a diagram of a telephone receiver; geometric shapes from engineering structures; representations of sign language and the phonetic alphabet; the geese which helped him to understand flight; and the sheep which he studied to understand genetics (3 March 1997);
- Canada honored Bell with a $100CAD gold coin in tribute to the 150th anniversary of his birth (1997), and with a silver dollar coin celebrating the 100th anniversary of flight in Canada (2009);
- Canada's Walk of Fame in Toronto, Ontario, awarded a special star to Bell as part of its new "Innovators' Category". The star (photo at right), with an early model telephone engraved in its very center, is located on Simcoe Street in Toronto (2001);
- The Ontario Government's Member of Parliament, MPP Dave Levac, along with Bell's descendants, dedicated the Brant County section of Provincial Highway 403 as "The Alexander Graham Bell Parkway", as well as an outdoor stage named the "Bell Heritage Stage" in Brantford, Ontario (2005);
- Google created a special web page on his birthday, with links to informational websites on him (2008);
- The Aegis School of Business in India established the Aegis Graham Bell Awards in 2010, covering the fields of Telecom, Internet, Media, and Edutainment (TIME). The awards are held in association with the Cellular Operator Association of India (COAI) and Convergence India, and were created in tribute to Bell (2010);
- Numerous other countries also issued coins, of both nominal and high value, as well as stamps dedicated to him and his inventions. Among the stamp releases are multiple definitive and commemorative issues by both Canada and the United States.

== Honorary names of schools, organizations, awards, and placenames ==
A number of schools, institutes, organizations, academic scholarships, awards, and places have been named in honour of Bell. A number of historic sites and other marks also commemorate both him and the first telephone company buildings. Among them are:

=== International ===
- Bell Crater, a large crater on the moon, named in his honor by the International Astronomical Union in 1970;
- The IEEE Alexander Graham Bell Medal, created by the Institute of Electrical and Electronics Engineers to annually honor outstanding contributions in the field of telecommunications (since 1976);

=== Canada ===
- The City of Brantford, Ontario, dedicated a major monument to Bell in 1917, the Bell Telephone Memorial within its Alexander Graham Bell Gardens, its inscription reading: "This Monument, the work of Walter S. Allward, R.C.A., Sculptor, was placed here through International subscription by the Bell Telephone Memorial Association to mark the invention of the Telephone at Brantford by Alexander Graham Bell in 1874". Additionally a large monument of a seated Bell is found at the entrance to Brantford's newer Bell Telephone Company of Canada building;
- The Alexander Graham Bell Canada Graduate Scholarships for Masters and Doctoral studies in engineering and the natural sciences is awarded annually by Canada's Natural Sciences and Engineering Research Council (NSERC) of Ottawa, Ontario (note the double usage of "Bell" in the award name);
- The Canadian Acoustical Association (CAA) annually awards the Alexander Graham Bell Student Prize in Speech Communication and Behavioral Acoustics for graduate research, named in tribute of Bell's lifelong research of speech and deafness;
- Alexander Graham Bell Institute, a part of Cape Breton University in Nova Scotia -and searchable on its website here;
- Alexander Graham Bell National Historic Site, maintained by Parks Canada, which incorporates the Alexander Graham Bell Museum, in Baddeck, Nova Scotia. The site is close to Bell's original Beinn Bhreagh estate. The National Historic Site in Baddeck, in conjunction with the Bell Museum are open to visitation;
- The Bell Homestead, also known as Melville House, overlooking Brantford, Ontario and the Grand River, was Bell's first home in North America. Both the Bell Homestead and the historic Bell Telephone Company Building (see below) are open to visitors;
- The Bell Homestead Society maintains two historic buildings related to the extended Bell family: the first being their private residence (see item above) and the other one being The Henderson Home, Canada's first telephone company building of the nascent Bell Telephone Company of Canada. The Henderson Home was originally built on Sheridan Street within the city of Brantford, Ontario, and was then carefully relocated in 1969 to its current site at the historic Bell Homestead site. Both the Bell Homestead and the Bell Telephone Company Building are open to visitation;
- The Alexander Graham Bell Memorial Park, featuring a broad neoclassical monument depicting mankind's ability to communicate across the globe instantly;
- The Alexander Graham Bell Museum (opened in 1956), which is part of the Alexander Graham Bell National Historic Site (completed in 1978) in Baddeck, Nova Scotia. Numerous museum artifacts were contributed by Bell's daughters;
- The Alexander Graham Bell Club (founded 1891), Canada's oldest continuing women's club, which grew out of a social organization started at Beinn Bhreagh, Nova Scotia, by Mabel Bell, Alexander's wife. Bell's granddaughter and former secretary, Dr. Mabel Harlakenden Grosvenor, was its former Honorary President, until her death in 2006. The club, originally created as The Young Ladies Of Baddeck Club, was renamed in 1922 after Bell's death, and after Mabel Bell declined the use of her name.
- Graham Bell-Victoria School, a public school in Brantford, ON (an amalgamation of two different public schools);
- Alexander Graham Bell Public School, in Ajax, ON;
- Alexander Graham Bell High School, in Halifax, Nova Scotia;
- Graham Bell Court, in Milton, Ontario;
- Alexander Graham Bell Drive in Sydney, Nova Scotia, which intersects two other historically named streets associated with Bell: Douglas McCurdy Drive and Silver Dart Way, adjacent to J.A. Douglas McCurdy Sydney Airport;
- rue Graham-Bell (street), in the city of Boucherville; and in Quebec City; in Saint-Bruno-de-Montarville; in Saguenay plus also in Longueuil, Quebec;
- The Graham Bell Museum Gift Shop & Tea Room, on Big Baddeck Road, Baddeck, Nova Scotia, B0E 1B0.
- A statue of Alexander and Mabel Bell by Peter Buston was unveiled on the waterfront in Baddeck, Nova Scotia, in 2008.

=== China ===
- Bei'er Road (street and Metro station), in the Longgang district of Shenzhen City. Note that the name was using pinyin notation and not the original surname.

=== France ===
- rue Graham Bell (street), in the city of Metz, Lorraine; and in La Roche-sur-Yon in western France; and in the town of Mérignac, Gironde, Aquitaine; plus also in the community of Noisy-le-Grand, Marne-la-Vallée, Paris;
- avenue Alexander Graham Bell, in Parc Léonard de Vinci, Marne La Vallee, Paris.

=== India ===
- Alexander Graham Bell Road, in Malabar Hill, Mumbai.

=== Germany ===
- Alexander Graham Bell Straße, in Bonn;
- Graham-Bell Weg, in Garbsen, Hannover;
- Graham-Bell Straße, in Augsburg.

=== Mexico ===
- Graham Bell Street, in Residencial Los Robles, Apodaca.

=== New Zealand ===
- Graham Bell Avenue, in Mount Roskill, Auckland.

=== Russia ===
- Graham Bell Island, in the Franz Josef Archipelago.

=== South Africa ===
- Graham Bell Street, in Despatch, Eastern Cape, a small town near Port Elizabeth.

=== Switzerland ===
- Graham Bell Strasse, in Reinach.

=== Spain ===
- Graham Bell Street, in Campanillas, Málaga.

=== The Netherlands ===
- Graham Bell Straat, in Amsterdam;
- Graham Bell Straat, in Heerlen.

=== United Kingdom ===
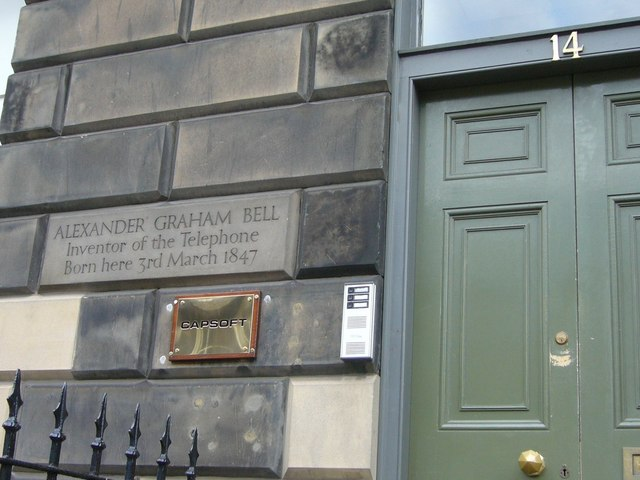
One of two markers at Bell's birthplace, 14 South Charlotte Street, Edinburgh, Scotland. (Courtesy: Kim Traynor)

- Alexander Graham Bell Birthplace, at a house on 14 South Charlotte Street in Edinburgh, Scotland, where there's an inscribed stone beside the doorway of his birth home, and additionally one within its entrance way;
- The Alexander Graham Bell Building, at the University of Edinburgh, which was named after him;
- The Alexander Graham Bell Apartment, an apartment-hotel also in Edinburgh.

=== United States ===
- The Alexander Graham Bell Laboratory in Washington, D.C., the informal name of the Volta Laboratory established by the Volta Associates in 1881;
- Two historic tablets plus a minor monument near Exeter Place in Boston, MA mark the location of the Alexander Graham Bell's first successful telephone and the words he first transmitted to his assistant, Thomas Augustus Watson. The monument's inscription reads: "• Birthplace of the Telephone • Here, on June 2, 1875, Alexander Graham Bell and Thomas A. Watson first transmitted sound over wires. This successful experiment was completed in a fifth floor garret at what was 109 Court Street and marked the beginning of world-wide telephone service • The First Telephone •"'. The separate historic markers were erected by The Bostonian Society and the New England Telephone and Telegraph Company in 1916, and by the Institute of Electrical and Electronics Engineers in 2006;
- The Alexander Graham Bell Professorship of Health Care Entrepreneurship was established by Boston University in his memory;
- The Alexander Graham Bell Scholarship is awarded to Boston University College of Engineering students;
- Alexander Graham Bell School, a public grammar (K–8) school on the north side of Chicago, Illinois, providing programs to deaf, blind, mentally disabled, gifted as well as standard students;
- Alexander Graham Bell Association for the Deaf and Hard of Hearing, headquartered in Washington, D.C., and with chapters across the United States, as well as internationally. The Association also sponsors the AG Bell College Scholarship Awards Program for a number of deaf or hard of hearing full-time students pursuing undergraduate or graduate degrees. In 2010, 18 awards were granted ranging from $1,000 to $10,000;
- Alexander Graham Bell School PS 205Q, a public (K–5) school in Bayside, Queens, New York;
- Alexander Graham Bell Elementary School Academy, a (PK-8) public school on Larchmere Blvd. in Cleveland, Ohio, serving regular and hearing-impaired students;
- Alexander Graham Bell School, a preschool and kindergarten center for the Columbus Public Schools Hearing Impaired Program (CHIP) in Columbus, Ohio;
- Alexander Graham Bell Elementary School, a (K–1) public school in Columbus, OH;
- Alexander Graham Bell Elementary School, a (PK–8) public school for regular, gifted and deaf students in Chicago, IL;
- Alexander Graham Bell Montessori School, in Wheeling, IL. N.B.: Both Alexander and his wife Mabel Gardiner Hubbard were significant supporters of the Italian Montessori early childhood teaching method and helped established early Montessori schools in North America;
- Alexander Graham Bell Elementary School, in Detroit, MI;
- AG Bell Accelerated Academy, a school in Milwaukee, Wisconsin;
- Alexander Graham Bell Middle School, in San Diego, California
- AG Bell Academy for Listening and Spoken Language, at 3417 Volta Place, NW, Washington, D.C., an independently governed, subsidiary corporation of the Alexander Graham Bell Association for the Deaf and Hard of Hearing, which provides certification of listening, verbal and spoken language therapists, specialists and educators;
- Alexander Graham Bell Hall, one of the residences at Rochester Institute of Technology (RIT), adjacent to the National Technical Institute for the Deaf (NTID) building, was named in honor of Bell and dedicated in 1979 (Bell had spent significant amounts of his personal fortune creating institutions for the deaf). A brass plaque mounted at the entrance noted that Bell was "a brilliant and innovative teacher of the deaf who dedicated a great portion of his life to help deaf children develop the potential for listening, speaking and lipreading. Today, NTID emulates the ideals for which Alexander Graham Bell worked". However those opposed to Bell's sole reliance on oralism, as well as his advocacy in the prevention of deafness via eugenics, protested the use of his name for the institutes's residence. In July 2008, the RIT president and its board of trustees approved the removal of the "Alexander Graham Bell Hall" name, along with its plaque. The RIT action is apparently the only known instance of a removal of Bell's name for ideological reasons;
- Alexander Graham Bell Boulevard, in Lehigh Acres, Lee County, Florida;
- Alexander Graham Bell Drive, in Columbia, Maryland, and in Reston, Virginia.

== Alexander Graham Bell in popular culture ==
=== In fiction ===
- Eric Walters' The Hydrofoil Mystery (1999) sets a novel in Alexander Graham Bell's workshops, casting the hydrofoil as a new weapon of war being readied for use against German U-boats during the First World War.

=== In music ===
- In the early 1970s, the UK rock group The Sweet recorded a tribute to Bell and the telephone, suitably titled "Alexander Graham Bell". The song gives a fictional account of the invention, in which Bell devises the telephone so he can talk to his girlfriend who lives on the other side of the United States. The song reached the top 40 in the UK and went on to sell over one million recordings worldwide.
- Another musical tribute to Bell, Alexander Graham Bell (2006) was written by the British songwriter and guitarist Richard Thompson. The chorus reminds the listener that "of course there was the telephone, he'd be famous for that alone, but there's 50 other things as well from Alexander Graham Bell".

=== In film and TV ===
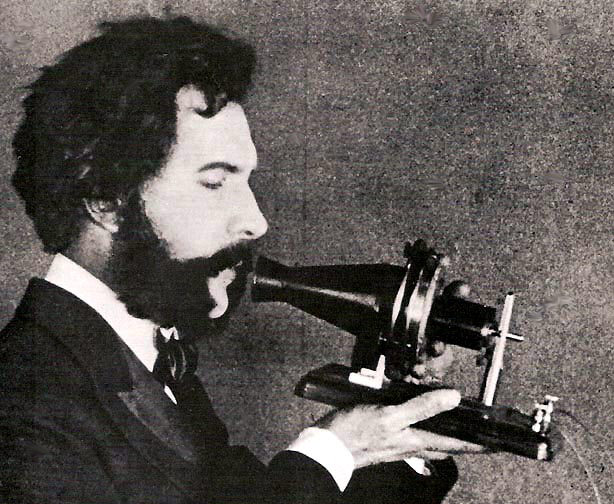
An actor portraying Bell speaking into an early model telephone for a 1926 promotional film by AT&T.

- The Story of Alexander Graham Bell, (reformatted for VCR) Don Ameche playing Bell, ISBN 0-7939-1251-2 (1939);
- Biography –Alexander Graham Bell, A&E DVD biography based on historical footage and still pictures of Bell, (2005);
- The Sound and the Silence: The Story of Alexander Graham Bell (TV miniseries) with John Bach as Bell; Vanessa Vaughan and Elizabeth Quinn portrayed Bell's fiancé and wife respectively; Canada / New Zealand / Ireland (1992) ASIN B0009K7RUW;
- Animated Hero Classics: Alexander Graham Bell (1995).
- Bell has been honoured on numerous television programs, including programs in three different countries to determine their "greatest citizens": #57 on The 100 Greatest Britons (2002), #9 on The Greatest Canadians (2004), and The 100 Greatest Americans (2005) (only the Top 25 on American list were numbered). The nominees and rankings of these programs were determined by popular vote.

== Corporate namesakes ==
The "Bell" trademark has been used, and is still in use, with a variety of telephone companies in North America and around the world, including:

- Alcatel-Lucent Shanghai Bell, which since 2009 is the new name of the former Alcatel Shanghai Bell (since 2001), which was originally created as the Shanghai Bell Manufacturing Co. in 1983;
- American Bell Telephone Company, the new name of the former National Bell Telephone Company. It obtained its new name on March 20, 1880, and was then later absorbed into its own subsidiary American Telephone and Telegraph (AT&T) on December 30, 1899;
- Bell Atlantic Corporation, the former name of Verizon Communications Inc., which is still currently part of the Regional Bell Operating Companies;
- Bell Canada, the new name of the Bell Telephone Company of Canada;
- Bell Communications Research, or Bellcore, the name formerly used by today's Telcordia Technologies prior to 1997. The Bellcore lab was a consortium established by the Regional Bell Operating Companies (RBOC) upon their separation from AT&T in 1984;
- Bell Patent Association, technically not a corporation but a trusteeship and a partnership first established verbally in 1874 to be the holders of the patents produced by Bell and his assistant Thomas Watson. Approximately 30% interests were to be held by Gardiner Greene Hubbard, a lawyer and Bell's future father-in-law, Thomas Sanders, the well-to-do leather merchant father of one of Bell's deaf students, and finally Bell himself. The last 10% interest of the association was assigned to Bell's assistant Thomas Watson, in lieu of salary. The verbal Patent Association agreement was first formalized in a memorandum of agreement on February 27, 1875. The Patent Association's assets later became the foundation of the Bell Telephone Company, a common law joint stock company created in July 1877 by Gardiner Hubbard;
- Bell Telephone Company founded on July 9, 1877, by Alexander Graham Bell's father-in-law Gardiner Greene Hubbard and a partner. It was renamed the National Bell Telephone Company on February 17, 1879;
- Bell Telephone Company of Canada, the forerunner of today's Bell Canada which owns its 'Bell' trademark outright in Canada;
- Bell Telephone Company of Illinois;
- Bell Telephone Company of Michigan;
- Bell Telephone Company of New Jersey;
- Bell Telephone Company of Pennsylvania;
- Bell Telephone Laboratories, the former name of the Bell Laboratories, the research and development arm of the Bell System, and also formerly known as AT&T Bell Laboratories. Bell Laboratories is now the research organization of Alcatel-Lucent;
- Bell Telephone Manufacturing Company of Belgium, created as a subsidiary of the International Bell Telephone Company in 1882, and which was sold to International Telephone & Telegraph (ITT) in 1925. ITT later divested all its international telecommunication assets to Alcatel-Lucent in 1989;
- Bell System, which referred to a popular name used to describe the group of companies which operated initial telephone services in the United States and Canada;
- BellSouth Advertising & Publishing Corporation, publishes telephone directories for AT&T customers served by BellSouth Telecommunications. It is a wholly owned subsidiary of AT&T founded in 1984 to undertake the operations of the Bell System Yellow Pages owned by Southern Bell and South Central Bell. BAPCO published its directories under the "Real Pages" name;
- BellSouth Telecommunications, Inc., currently part of the Regional Bell Operating Companies of AT&T, serves the southeastern United States (Alabama/Florida/Georgia/Kentucky/Louisiana/Mississippi/North Carolina/South Carolina/Southeast/Tennessee). BellSouth Telecommunications was formed on January 1, 1992, when BellSouth merged its operating companies, Southern Bell and South Central Bell, into one entity;
- Cincinnati Bell, Inc., a former independent Bell System franchise Cincinnati Bell, which was not part of the 1984 divestiture from AT&T;
- Compagnie Belge du Telephone Bell, of Antwerp, Belgium, formed in 1882 as a subsidiary of the International Bell Telephone Company;
- Edison Gower-Bell Telephone Company of Europe, Ltd., which held telephone patents for Bell, Edison and Frederic Gower (see next item below) in Europe, and was responsible for sales to all European countries outside Britain, France, Turkey and Greece;
- Gower Bell Telephone Company was a European company created by Frederic Allan Gower of the United States, who previously had a Bell franchise in New England in the early 1880s. In the UK he created a telephone of his own design, free of Bell's patents, that became the common British Post Office telephone; In 1881 Gower Bell joined with the United Telephone Company (an amalgamation of the Edison and Bell companies in London) and created the Consolidated Telephone Construction and Maintenance Co. Ltd., to manufacture telephones;
- Illinois Bell Telephone Company, operating as AT&T Illinois;
- Indiana Bell Telephone Company, Inc., operating as AT&T Indiana;
- International Bell Telephone Company, formed in 1880 to help promote Bell's business outside of North America;
- Japan Bell Telephone, as well as Japan Bell Telephone Laboratories;
- Malheur Bell, the common name of the Malheur Home Telephone Company, a rural telephone company operating in Oregon that is a wholly owned subsidiary of Qwest Corporation;
- Michigan Bell Telephone Company, operating as AT&T Michigan;
- National Bell Telephone Company, the new name of the former Bell Telephone Company. It obtained its new name in March 1979, and was then later renamed to the American Bell Telephone Company in March 1880;
- Nederlandsche Bell Telefoon Maatschappij of the Netherlands, formed in 1881 as a subsidiary of the International Bell Telephone Company;
- New England Telephone and Telegraph Company, which merged with the Bell Telephone Company in 1877 to become the National Bell Telephone Company;
- New Jersey Bell Telephone Company, a currently existing regional LEC;
- Northwestern Bell Telephone Company, which provides services just north of the Southwestern Bell area, including: Iowa, Minnesota, South Dakota, North Dakota, and Nebraska;
- Nevada Bell Telephone Company, operating as AT&T Nevada;
- Ohio Bell Telephone Company, operating as AT&T Ohio;
- Oriental Bell Telephone Company of New York, which later became the Oriental Telephone Company which itself was established on January 25, 1881, as the result of an agreement between Alexander Graham Bell, Thomas Edison, and the Anglo-Indian Telephone Company, Ltd.. The company was licensed to sell telephones in Greece, Turkey, South Africa, India, Japan, China, and other Asian countries;
- Pacific Telephone & Telegraph Company was the name of the Bell System's telephone operations in California;
- Pacific Northwest Bell Telephone Company, which provides telephone service in the states of Oregon, Washington, and northern Idaho;
- Regional Bell Operating Companies (RBOC), which after 1984 included Southwestern Bell Corporation, BellSouth Corporation, and Bell Atlantic Corporation (which later evolved into Verizon Communications Inc.), along with several other non-"Bell" companies;
- Shanghai Bell Telephone Equipment Mfg Co., in Shanghai, China, formed with ITT's Belgium subsidiary BTM in 1983. In 1987 Alcatel purchased BTM and subsequently changed the Shanghai Bell Telephone name to Alcatel Shanghai Bell in 2001, and then Alcatel-Lucent Shanghai Bell in 2009;
- South Central Bell Telephone Company, headquartered in Birmingham, Alabama, was the name of the Bell System's operations in Alabama, Kentucky, Louisiana, Mississippi, and Tennessee. South Central Bell was created in July 1968 when the Bell telephone operations in those states were split off from Southern Bell;
- Southern New England Telephone, started operations on January 27, 1878, as the District Telephone Company of New Haven. It was the founder of the first telephone exchange, as well as the world's first telephone book. It currently does business as AT&T Connecticut;
- Southwestern Bell Corporation, currently part of the Regional Bell Operating Companies;
- The Telephone Company (Bell's Patents) Ltd was registered in London, England on 4 June 1878. It opened in London 21 August 1879, becoming Europe's first telephone exchange.
- Wisconsin Bell Inc., operating as AT&T Wisconsin;
