= Berkner =

Berkner may refer to:

- Berkner Island, the southernmost island of the world
- Berkner (crater), a lunar crater
- Laurie Berkner (born 1969), American musician
- Lloyd Berkner (1905–1967), American physicist and engineer; also
  - Lloyd V. Berkner High School in Richardson, Texas, named for him
