= Comrie =

Comrie may refer to:

== Places ==
- Comrie (crater), a lunar crater
- Comrie, Fife, a village in Fife, Scotland
- Comrie, Perth and Kinross, a village and parish in Strathearn, Scotland

== People with the surname ==
- Aaron Comrie (born 1997), Scottish footballer
- Adam Comrie (1990–2020), Canadian ice hockey player
- Bernard Comrie (born 1947), British linguist
- Elvis Comrie (born 1959), American soccer player
- Eric Comrie, born 1995), Canadian ice hockey player
- John Comrie (1875–1939), Scottish physician and medical historian
- Leroy Comrie, New York City council member
- Leslie Comrie (1893–1950), New Zealand astronomer
- Mike Comrie (born 1980), Canadian ice hockey player
- Neil Comrie (born 1947), Australian police commissioner
- Paul Comrie (born 1977), Canadian ice hockey player
