= Bell Elementary School =

Bell Elementary School may refer to:

- Alexander Graham Bell School (Chicago, Illinois)
- Bell Elementary School - Bell, Florida - Gilchrist County School District
- Bell Elementary School - Monticello, Kentucky - Wayne County School District
- Bell Elementary School - Papillion, Nebraska - Papillion La Vista Community Schools
- LJ Bell Elementary School - Rockingham, North Carolina - Richmond County Schools
- Bell Elementary School (also Bell Public Schools) - Stilwell, Oklahoma - Belfonte Public Schools
- Catherine Coleman Bell Elementary School - Little Elm, Texas - Denton Independent School District
- Kate Bell Elementary School - Houston, Texas - List of Houston Independent School District elementary schools
