= V348 Sagittarii =

Variable star in the constellation Sagittarius

Observation data Epoch J2000.0 Equinox ICRS
- Constellation: Sagittarius
- Right ascension: 18^{h} 40^{m} 19.929^{s}
- Declination: −22° 54′ 29.31″
- Apparent magnitude (V): 11.2 to 18.4

Characteristics
- Spectral type: pec(HDCe)/WC10:
- Variable type: RCrB

Astrometry
Proper motion (μ)	RA: −1.767 mas/yr Dec.: −5.184 mas/yr
Parallax (π)	0.8849±0.1365 mas
Distance	approx. 3,700 ly (approx. 1,100 pc)

Details
Radius	6 R_{☉}
Luminosity (bolometric)	6,000 L_{☉}
Temperature	20,000 K

Other designations
- V348 Sgr, GCRV 68458, IRAS 18372-2257

Database references
SIMBAD	data

V348 Sagittarii is a peculiar variable star in the southern constellation of Sagittarius, abbreviated V348 Sgr. It ranges in brightness from an apparent visual magnitude of 11.2 down to 18.4, requiring a telescope to view. Based on parallax measurements, it is located at an approximate distance of 3,700 light years from the Sun.

== Observations ==
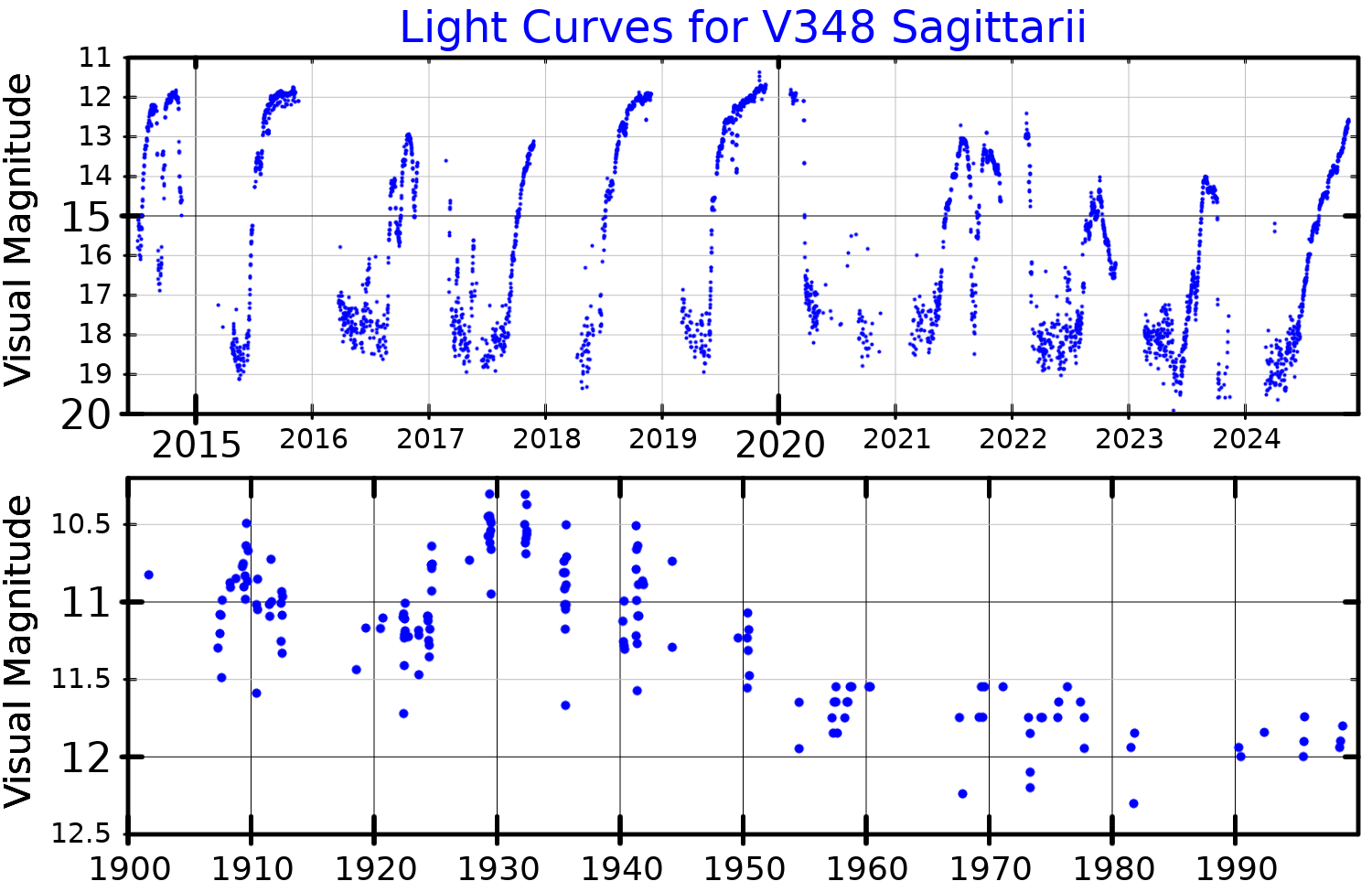
Visual band light curves for V348 Sagittarii. The upper panel shows the AAVSO data for approximately one decade. The lower panel (adapted from De Marco et al.) shows the estimated maximum brightness of the star during the 20th century, over which the star's peak brightness faded by about one magnitude.

The variability of this star was announced in 1926 by I. E. Woods. It was independently discovered by P. Shajn in 1929. Woods found a photographic magnitude range of 11.0 to below 16.5. P. Parenago published a light curve study in 1931, showing a brightness range of 11.4 down to below 14.7. It was labelled a suspected R Coronae Borealis variable (RCrB), most likely due to its behavior of either being near maximum brightness or quite faint. Photographs of the star taken in 1950 at maximum brightness show that it is surrounded by a nebulous envelope.

A study of the star was requested by G. Herbig in 1956, who found it unique among well studied variable stars. The minimum brightness was found to be magnitude 17.0–17.5. The change from minimum to maximum occurred relatively rapidly over a period of 30–60 days, with the maximum occurring roughly every 200 days, although it was found to increase from 170 days in 1907 to 230 days in 1950. The duration of the maximum also varied, with an interval of 180 days observed in 1909, but was usually much shorter. The spectrum was nearly featureless, with several emission lines visible.

Continuing studies found the light curve is highly irregular, in one instance changing from magnitude 12 to under 17 in four days. High resolution spectrograms taken in 1968 showed emission lines of ionized carbon and other ions, while displaying an excess of nitrogen and neon. Infrared photometry showed a prominent infrared excess with a blackbody temperature of roughly 800 K. The behavior and spectra suggested an evolved star that has previously ejected its hydrogen-rich envelope, forming a surrounding nebula. The infrared excess may be previously ejected carbon that has formed dust particules.

V348 Sgr is now classified as a 'peculiar extreme helium star', forming the central star of the planetary nebula PN G011.1-07.9. It has been fading in B-band brightness since its discovery, with a decline rate of 1.3 magnitudes per century. This is believed to occur due to the evolution of the star from right to left across the Hertzsprung–Russell diagram; as the star contracts, the temperature rises, but the luminosity stays constant. It is postulated that this star has undergone a final helium flash during its post-asymptotic giant branch stage.

The infrared spectrum of this star is similar to cool RCrB variables and some novae. The spectral energy distribution indicates V348 Sgr is host to a circumstellar disk of dust. The best fit model has the orbiting disk radius ranging from 11 to 70 AU with a mass equal to 5% of the mass of the Sun. Its composition is mostly carbon grains in an amorphous or disordered structure. The brightness variations of the star are caused by obscurations from the carbon-rich dust. There is an extended envelope of dust that ranges from 22 to 400 AU around the host star. This envelope contains 1.5×10^{−5} M_{☉}.
