= Robert J. Helberg =

American aeronautical engineer

Robert Helberg
- Born: 1906; Watonga, Oklahoma, U.S.
- Died: 1967 (aged 60–61); Seattle, Washington, U.S.
- Education: University of Washington (BS)

Robert J. Helberg (1906 – 1967) was an American aeronautical engineer who worked on several development projects for Boeing and NASA.

== Early life and education ==
He was born in Watonga, Oklahoma. In 1932, he earned a Bachelor of Science degree in aeronautical engineering from the University of Washington.

== Career ==
After graduation, he worked at the Goss Humidity Control Company in Seattle. Three years later he left to work for the Boeing company.

Helberg's first work at Boeing was on the early YB-17 model of the Flying Fortress. He followed this by work on the Boeing 307 Stratoliner airliner, then on additional models of the B-17. In 1942 he became group engineer on the B-29's electrical systems. By 1946 he was senior group engineer, working on the C-97 Stratofreighter's electrical systems.

In 1950, he received a promotion to project engineer on an experimental version of a pilotless B-47 Stratojet. (This program was designated Project Brass Ring.) Around 1955 he joined the Bomarc Missile Program, a pilotless interceptor. He worked on this program as assistant project engineer, focused on the guidance and data systems. He later became lead engineer for production, and then head of the Bomarc operation. Helberg was awarded a patent for an automatic control cable tensioner. This device was used in Boeing-built bombers.

In 1965 he was placed in charge of the company's Lunar Orbiter Program Office, as an assistant division manager in the Spacecraft Systems of the Boeing Space Division. He helped co-design two of the Lunar Orbiter spacecraft.

== Personal life ==
By 1966 Helberg had developed a heart condition and was taking nitroglycerin tablets to treat the symptoms. In his later years, he lived with his wife Helen on a farm

in the Seattle area. His hobbies included fishing, duck hunting, poker, gardening, and raising trees at a nearby tree farm. He died of a heart attack in Seattle in 1967.

== Honors ==
- For his contributions to the success of the Lunar Orbiter, he received the NASA Exceptional Public Service Medal
- Astronautics Engineer Award given by the National Space Club in 1966
- The crater Helberg on the Moon is named after him.
