= Helberg (crater) =

Crater on the Moon

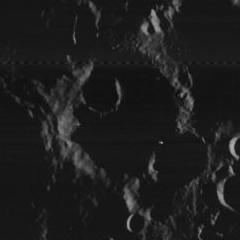
- Lunar Orbiter 4 image of Helberg, while at the lunar terminator
- Coordinates: 22.63°N 102.46°W
- Diameter: 61.93 km (38.48 mi)
- Depth: Unknown
- Colongitude: 103° at sunrise
- Eponym: Robert J. Helberg

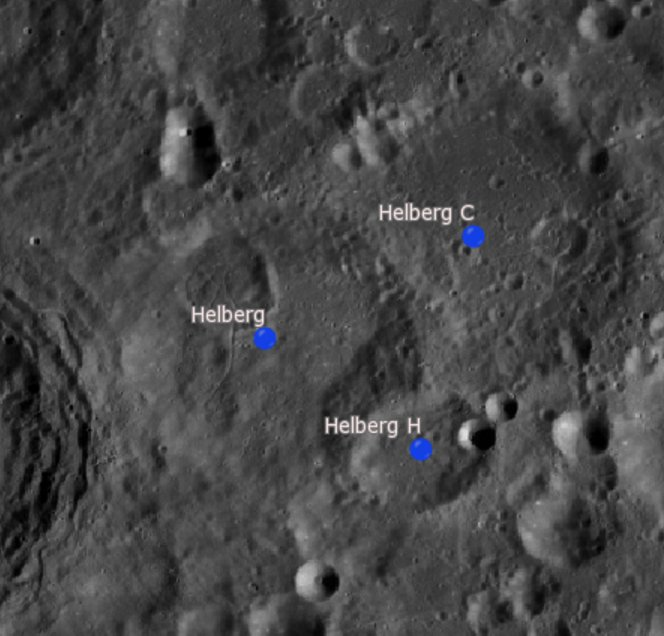
Satellite craters of Helberg

Helberg is a lunar impact crater that is located just behind the western limb of the Moon, on the far side from the Earth. Due to libration this part of the surface is sometimes brought into view, and the crater is visible under suitable lighting conditions. However even under these circumstances the crater is viewed from the edge and not much detail can be seen.

This crater is nearly attached to the east-northeastern rim of the crater Robertson. Within a crater diameter to the northwest lies Berkner, and farther to the east is Bell.

This is an eroded crater formation which overlies Helberg C along the east-northeastern side and Helberg H to the southeast. The southern rim is somewhat uneven, with an area of intrusion to the southwest. The interior floor has the remains of a crater rim at the northern end. It is otherwise relatively featureless.

Prior to formal naming by the IAU in 1970, Helberg was called Crater 178. The crater Helberg C, to the northeast of Helberg, was called Crater 179.

== Satellite craters ==
By convention these features are identified on lunar maps by placing the letter on the side of the crater midpoint that is closest to Helberg.

Helberg	Latitude	Longitude	Diameter
C	23.4° N	100.6° W	70 km
H	21.8° N	101.2° W	29 km
