= Parenago (crater) =

Crater on the Moon

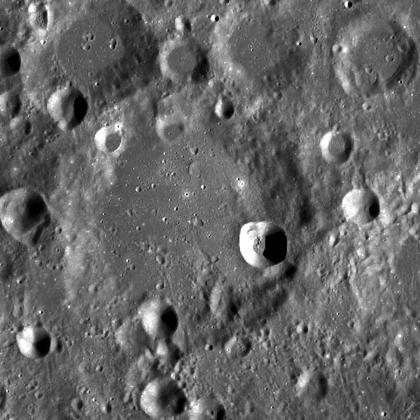
- LRO image
- Coordinates: 25.88°N 108.91°W
- Diameter: 94.57 km (58.76 mi)
- Depth: Unknown
- Colongitude: 110° at sunrise
- Eponym: Pavel P. Parenago

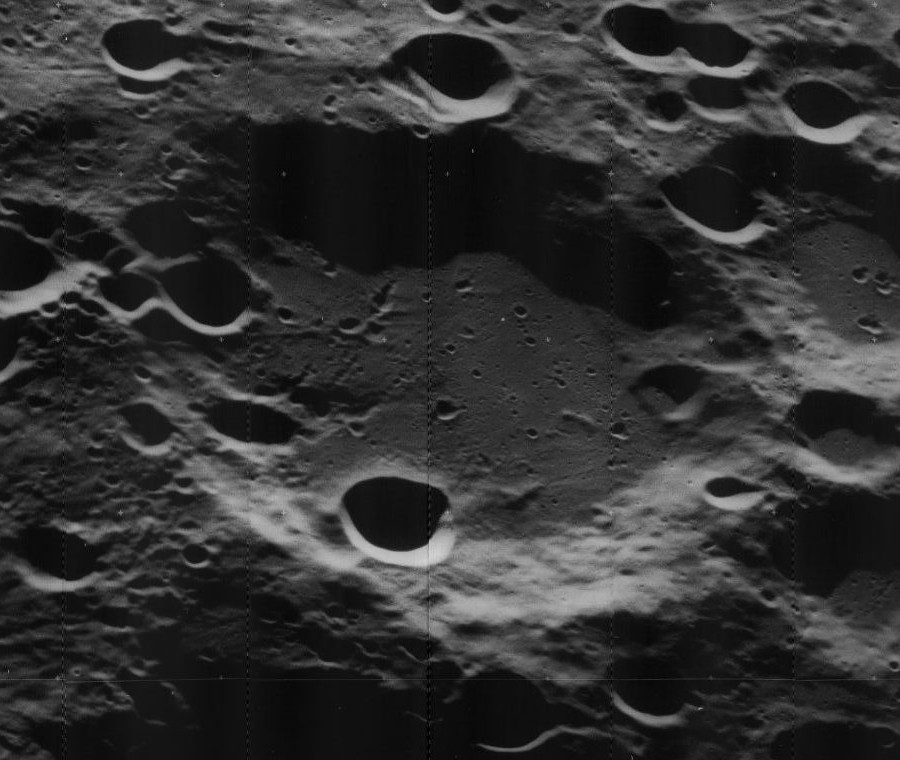
Oblique Lunar Orbiter 5 image, facing west

Parenago is an impact crater on the Moon's far side, behind the eastern limb. Nearly attached to the east-southeastern outer rim of Parenago is the crater Berkner. To the south-southwest lies Comrie.

This is a worn and eroded crater formation. Attached to the northern outer rim are the satellite craters Parenago W and Parenago Z. Three small craters lie prominently along the edge of the inner wall in the southeast quadrant of the interior floor. The floor is otherwise relatively level and is marked by only a few tiny crater-lets.

Prior to formal naming by the IAU in 1970, Parenago was called Crater 173.

== Satellite craters ==
By convention these features are identified on lunar maps by placing the letter on the side of the crater midpoint that is closest to Parenago.

Parenago	Latitude	Longitude	Diameter
T	26.0° N	110.7° W	18 km
W	27.8° N	109.7° W	49 km
Z	28.9° N	109.0° W	18 km
