= Leslie Comrie =

New Zealand astronomer

Leslie Comrie FRS
- Born: 15 August 1893; Pukekohe, New Zealand
- Died: 11 December 1950 (aged 57)
- Education: Auckland University College
- Known for: Ephemeris calculation automation
- Awards: Fellow of the Royal Society
- Scientific career
- Fields: Astronomy

Leslie John Comrie FRS (15 August 1893 – 11 December 1950) was an astronomer and a pioneer in mechanical computation.

== Life ==
Leslie John Comrie was born in Pukekohe (south of Auckland), New Zealand, on 15 August 1893. He attended Auckland University College (part of the University of New Zealand) from 1912 to 1916, graduating with BA and MA degrees with Honours in Chemistry. During World War I, despite severe deafness, he saw action in France with the New Zealand Expeditionary Force, and lost his left leg in February 1918 to a British shell. While convalescing, he started using a mechanical calculator and went on to modify commercial calculators for specific projects.

Having joined while in school in New Zealand, Comrie was eventually the first director (1920–1922) of the Computing Section of the British Astronomical Association. In 1923 he received a PhD from St John's College of the University of Cambridge. He travelled to the United States to teach at Swarthmore College and Northwestern University in 1924, where he also pioneered the teaching of numerical analysis. He returned to England to join the HM Nautical Almanac Office at the Royal Greenwich Observatory, where he became deputy superintendent in 1926.

At the Nautical Almanac Office he followed up the pioneer work of T.C. Hudson in pursuing mechanical calculation. His article On the Construction of Tables by Interpolation was published in April 1928, and described the use of punched card equipment for interpolating tables of data, in contrast to the more inefficient and error-prone methods involving mechanical devices like the pinwheel calculators under the Brunsviga brand name. In the same year, he became the first person to use punched card equipment for scientific calculations, by using Fourier synthesis to compute the principal terms in the motion of the Moon between 1935 and 2000 (improving upon the predictions of Ernest William Brown). Wallace J. Eckert, an American student of Brown at Columbia University, would later use IBM's vast computational resources to refine the predictions even further.

He was promoted to Superintendent of the Nautical Almanac Office in 1930. However, his unconventional use of machines for calculation caused tensions with his superiors, and he was suspended in August 1936.

Comrie founded in 1937 the world's first private company for scientific computing, incorporated as Scientific Computing Service, Limited. During World War II, he headed a team of 30 scientists to computerize war work, such as the creation of bombing tables for the Allies of World War II. He later used this technology to computerize British football pools.

After the war, Comrie visited the United States and New Zealand in 1948. Comrie was elected a Fellow of the Royal Society of London in March 1950.

Comrie is also remembered for his work in astronomy, as he published both scientific and popular articles on subjects ranging from predicting eclipses to the green flash. He died on 11 December 1950 at age 57, following a series of strokes. Comrie crater (23.3N 112.7W) on the Moon, and an asteroid, 3521 Comrie, bear his name, as does the computer lab at the University of Auckland, which was named on the 50th anniversary of his death.

== Publications ==
- Comrie, L. J.; Levin, A.E. (1921). "Eclipse of Rhea by the shadow of Titan". Monthly Notices of the Royal Astronomical Society. 81 (7): 486–487. Bibcode:1921MNRAS..81..486C. doi:10.1093/mnras/81.7.486.
- Comrie, L. J. (1928). "On the construction of tables by interpolation". Monthly Notices of the Royal Astronomical Society. 88 (6): 506–523. Bibcode:1928MNRAS..88..506C. doi:10.1093/mnras/88.6.506.
- "1928 March 9 meeting of the Royal Astronomical Society". The Observatory. 81: 105–106. 1928. Bibcode:1928Obs....51..105.
- —— (1932). "The application of the Hollerith tabulating machine to Brown's tables of the moon". Monthly Notices of the Royal Astronomical Society. 92 (7): 694–707. Bibcode:1932MNRAS..92..694C. doi:10.1093/mnras/92.7.694.
- —— (1933). "The computation of total solar eclipses". Monthly Notices of the Royal Astronomical Society. 93 (3): 175–181. Bibcode:1933MNRAS..93..175C. doi:10.1093/mnras/93.3.175.
- —— (1933). "The total solar eclipse of 1940 October 1". Monthly Notices of the Royal Astronomical Society. 93 (3): 181–184. Bibcode:1933MNRAS..93..181C. doi:10.1093/mnras/93.3.181.
- —— (1937). "The application of the Brunsviga twin 13Z calculating machine to the Hartmann formula for the reduction of prismatic spectrograms". The Observatory. 60: 70–73. Bibcode:1937Obs....60...70C.
- Comrie, L. J.; Burrough, S. M. (December 1941). "Line of Planets". Popular Astronomy. 49: 397–398. Bibcode:1941PA.....49..397C.
- Comrie, L. J. (December 1942). "Errors in Mathematical Tables". Nature. 150 (3816): 738. Bibcode:1942Natur.150..738C. doi:10.1038/150738b0.
- "The application of commercial calculating machines to scientific computing". Mathematics of Computation. 2: 149–159. 1946. doi:10.1090/S0025-5718-1946-0017573-9.
- —— (December 1949). "The Green (?) Flash (?)". Popular Astronomy. 57: 42–43. Bibcode:1949PA.....57...42C.

== Obituaries ==
- "Obituary". Monthly Notices of the Royal Astronomical Society. 113 (3): 294–304. 1953. Bibcode:1953MNRAS.113R.294.
- "Obituary". Journal of the British Astronomical Association. 61 (4): 132. 1951. Bibcode:1951JBAA...61..132.
- "Obituary". The Observatory. 71 (4): 24. 1951. Bibcode:1951Obs....71...24.
- "Leslie John Comrie". Obituary Notices of Fellows of the Royal Society. 8 (21). Royal Society: 96–107. 1952. doi:10.1098/rsbm.1952.0006.
