= Bell (crater) =

Lunar impact crater

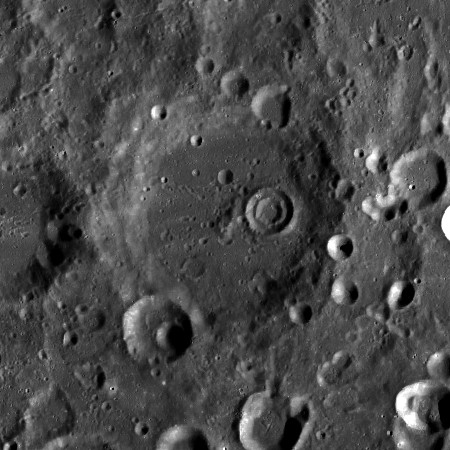
- LRO image
- Coordinates: 21.98°N 96.53°W
- Diameter: 86.33 km (53.64 mi)
- Depth: Unknown
- Colongitude: 97° at sunrise
- Formation: Nectarian ?
- Eponym: Alexander G. Bell

Bell is a lunar impact crater that is located on the far side of the Moon, just past the western limb. It lies in an area of terrain that is marked by many small craters, a number of which are satellite craters of Bell listed in the table below. Bell lies within two crater diameters of Laue to the north, and to the west of the smaller Helberg.

On the lunar geologic timescale, Bell is catalogued as from the Nectarian period, but may instead be Pre-Nectarian or Early Imbrian. The outer wall of Bell has been worn, eroded, and somewhat reshaped by subsequent impacts. The satellite crater Bell Q lies across the southwest rim, and smaller craterslie across the rim to the north and the east. The interior floor is relatively level, and marked by the crater Bell E which is offset to the east of the midpoint. The flat floor is most likely due to lava infiltrating the ground from below, but not breaching the surface.

This crater was named after Scottish-American inventor Alexander G. Bell (1847–1922). Prior to formal naming by the International Astronomical Union in 1970, Bell was called Crater 182.

== Satellite craters ==
By convention these features are identified on lunar maps by placing the letter on the side of the crater midpoint that is closest to Bell.

Bell	Latitude	Longitude	Diameter
E	22.0° N	95.8° W	15 km
J	19.9° N	94.0° W	18 km
K	18.3° N	95.1° W	18 km
L	19.7° N	95.8° W	23 km
N	19.5° N	96.9° W	18 km
Q	20.7° N	97.2° W	23 km
T	21.9° N	98.9° W	52 km
Y	25.4° N	96.7° W	23 km

== Gallery ==
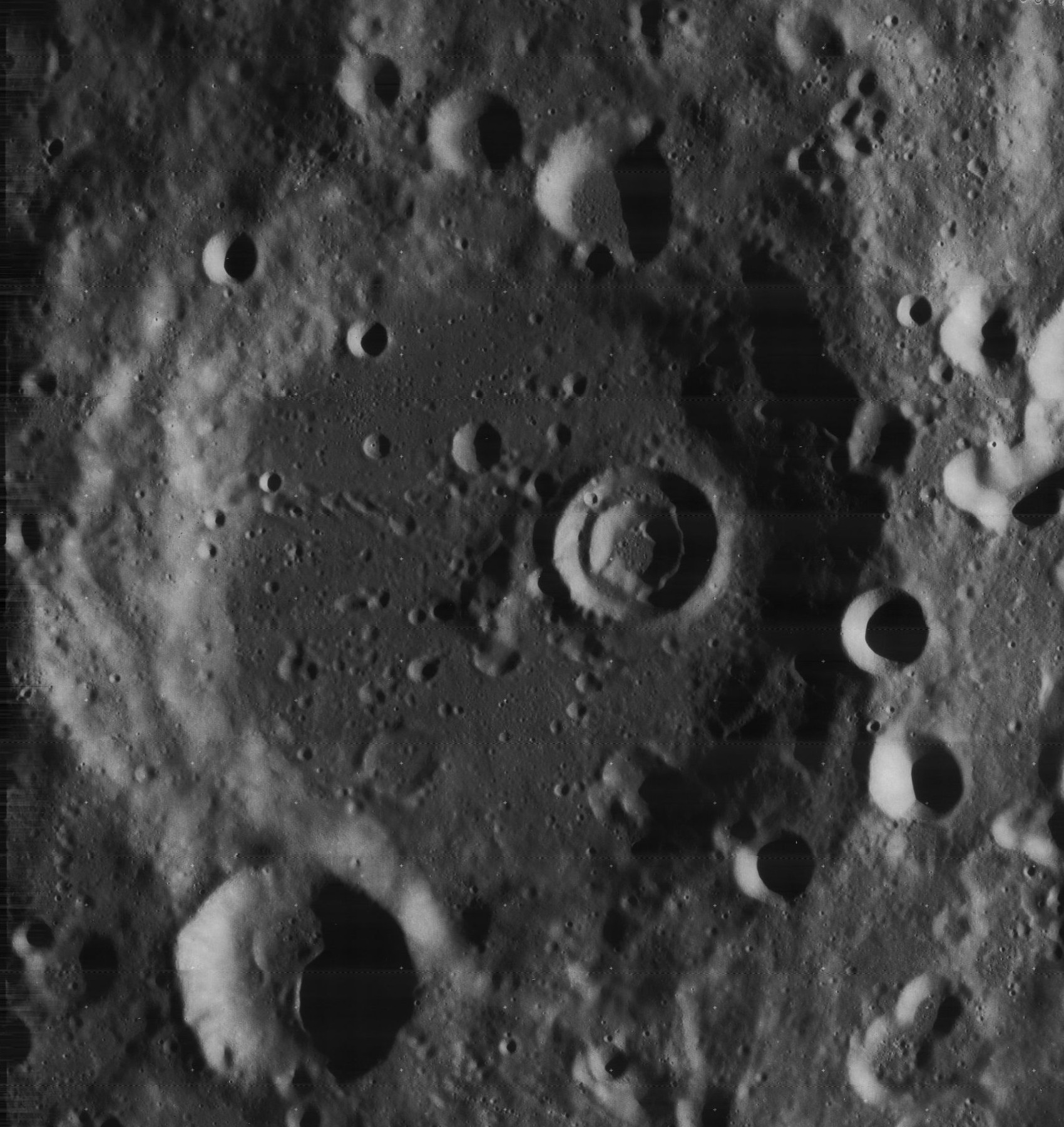
Lunar Orbiter 4 image

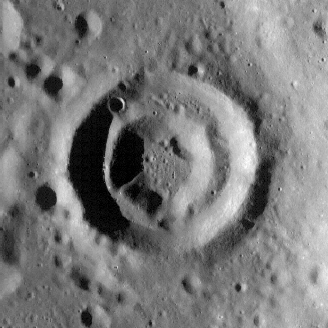
The concentric crater Bell E
