= Lloyd Berkner =

American physicist and engineer

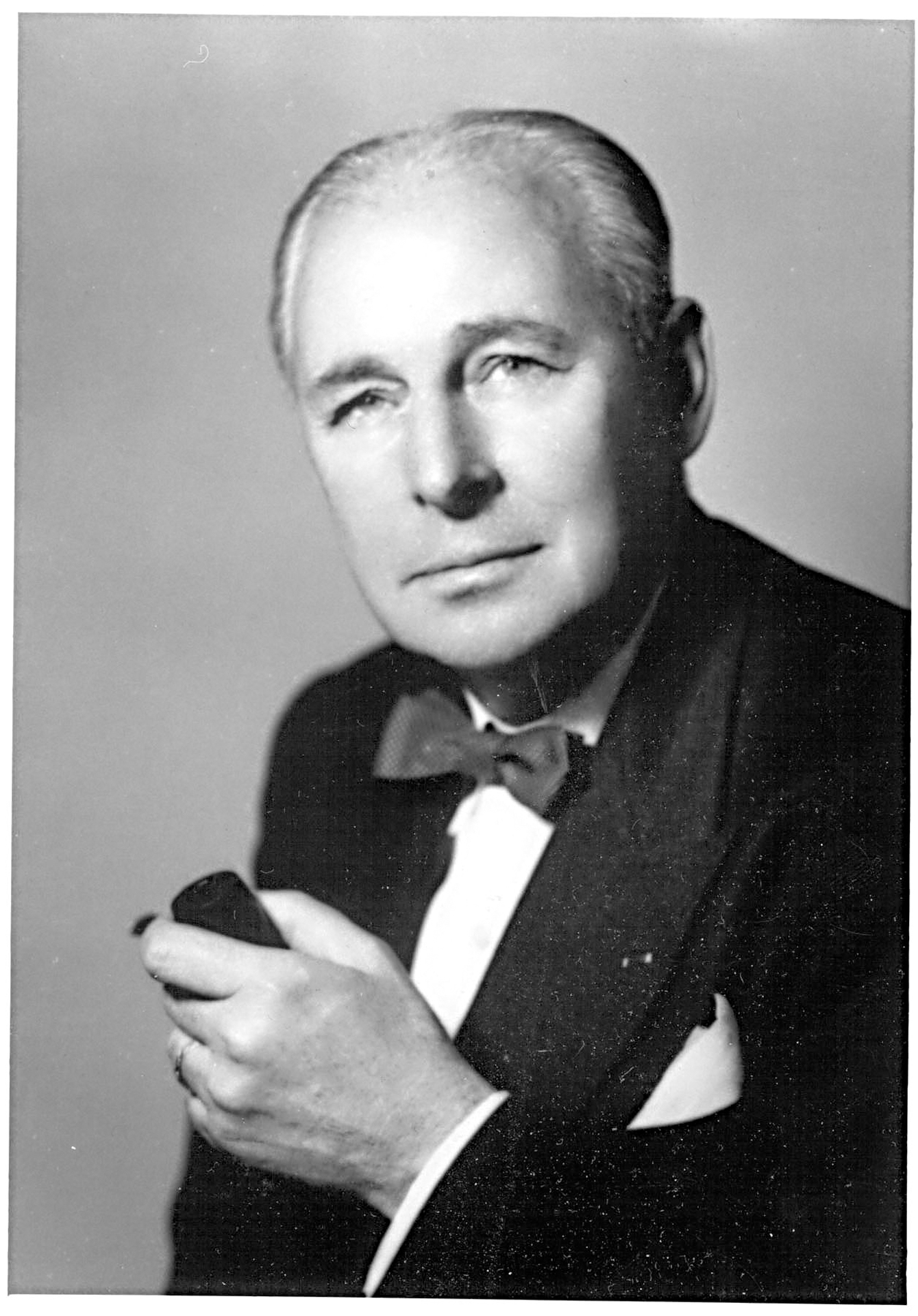
- Berkner c. 1961
- Born: February 1, 1905; Milwaukee, Wisconsin, United States
- Died: June 4, 1967 (aged 62); Washington D.C., United States
- Education: University of Minnesota, B.S. 1927
- Known for: Proposing the International Geophysical Year for 1957-1958, various work in aeronautics, meteorology and education
- Children: 2
- Awards: William Bowie Medal (1967)
- Scientific career
- Fields: Geophysics

Lloyd Viel Berkner (February 1, 1905 – June 4, 1967) was an American physicist and engineer. He was one of the inventors of the measuring device that since has become standard at ionospheric stations because it measures the height and electron density of the ionosphere. The data obtained in the worldwide net of such instruments were important for the developing theory of short wave radio propagation to which Berkner himself gave important contributions.

Berkner was elected to the United States National Academy of Sciences in 1948. He was president of Associated Universities, Inc. from 1951 to 1960.

Later he investigated the development of the Earth's atmosphere. Since he needed data from the whole world, he proposed the International Geophysical Year in 1950. At that time, the IGY was the largest cooperative study of the Earth ever undertaken.

Berkner was elected a Fellow of the American Academy of Arts and Sciences and a member of the American Philosophical Society in 1956. The IGY was carried out by the International Council of Scientific Unions while he was president in 1957–1959. He was also a member of the President's Scientific Advisory Committee in 1958 while he was president of Associated Universities Inc.

In 1963, Berkner, with L.C. Marshall, advanced a theory to describe the way in which the atmospheres of the Solar System's inner planets had evolved.

Beginning in 1926, as a naval officer, Berkner assisted in the development of radar and navigation systems, naval aircraft electronics engineering, and studies that led to the construction of the Distant Early Warning system, a chain of radar stations designed to give the United States advance warning in the event of a missile attack across the North Pole. In the 1950s and 1960s, Berkner held intelligence clearances in the Atomic Energy Commission and other agencies. He worked with the CIA in some capacity as well, but any activities are wholly classified as of 2015.

Berkner worked with Dallas community leaders to establish the Graduate Research Center of the Southwest (later renamed the Southwest Center for Advanced Studies, which would eventually become The University of Texas at Dallas).

He wrote more than 100 papers and several books, including Rockets and Satellites (1958), Science in Space (1961), and The Scientific Age (1964).

In 1961, Berkner was president of the Institute of Radio Engineers.

== Legacy ==
Lloyd V. Berkner High School in Richardson, Texas was named after him in 1969, as was Lloyd V. Berkner Hall at the University of Texas at Dallas, and Berkner Hall auditorium/cafeteria at Brookhaven National Laboratory. The lunar crater Berkner was named in his honor. Berkner Island in Antarctica was also named for Berkner because of his work as a radio operator on the first Byrd expedition to Antarctica in 1928.

Berkner was married to Lillian Fulks Berkner and had two children.
