= Pavel Parenago =

Pavel Petrovich Parenago
- Born: 20 March 1906; Krasnodar, Russian Empire
- Died: 5 January 1960 (aged 53)
- Education: Moscow State University
- Known for: Research in galactic astronomy
- Awards: Order of Lenin, Bredikhin Prize
- Scientific career
- Fields: Astronomy
- Workplaces: Moscow State University, Soviet Academy of Sciences

Pavel Petrovich Parenago (Russian: Па́вел Петро́вич Парена́го, 20 March 1906 – 5 January 1960) was a Soviet scientist, astronomer, and professor. He served as the head of the Department of Stellar Astronomy at M.V. Lomonosov Moscow State University and a Corresponding Member of the Soviet Academy of Sciences.

== Early life and education ==
Pavel Petrovich Parenago was born into the family of a physician on 20 March 1906, in Krasnodar, present-day Russia. He completed his middle school education in Moscow in 1922, having begun scientific work while still in senior classes. He went on to graduate from Moscow State University in 1929 as a trained and qualified scientist.

== Research ==
In 1932, Parenago began studies of the structure and kinematics of the Milky Way based primarily on star data. He and a colleague, B.V. Kukarkin, began an extensive compilation of variable star data. During his studies, Parenago observed approximately 3,000 stars in the Orion Nebula region of the galaxy, the nearest star creating region to the Sun.

Parenago then assumed a post at Moscow University as reader in stellar astronomy, becoming the first person to teach a lecture course on the subject of galactic astronomy in the Soviet Union in 1934. In 1939, he gained full professorship and organized the Department of Stellar Astronomy, which he was named head of in 1940. Parenago then authored a textbook entitled Course in Stellar Astronomy.

In 1940, Parenago began investigating the absorption of light in interstellar space, during which he made discoveries relevant to this area of research. He also had an avid interest in amateur astronomy and published works and lectured in order to educate the public on the subject. He performed research on dwarf stars, hoping to find a cause for their unusual velocities, as well as the dynamics of star systems.

In the later part of his life, Parenago spent much of his time revising his earlier works until his death in 1960 after an illness lasting several years.

== Recognition ==
After being elected Corresponding Member of the Academy of Sciences in 1953, he became the first person to be awarded the Bredikhin Prize, an award founded by the academy, in 1954.

Parenago was awarded the Order of Lenin for contributions to Soviet science. An asteroid, 2484 Parenago, and a lunar crater, Parenago, are named after him.
