= Berkner (crater) =

Crater on the Moon

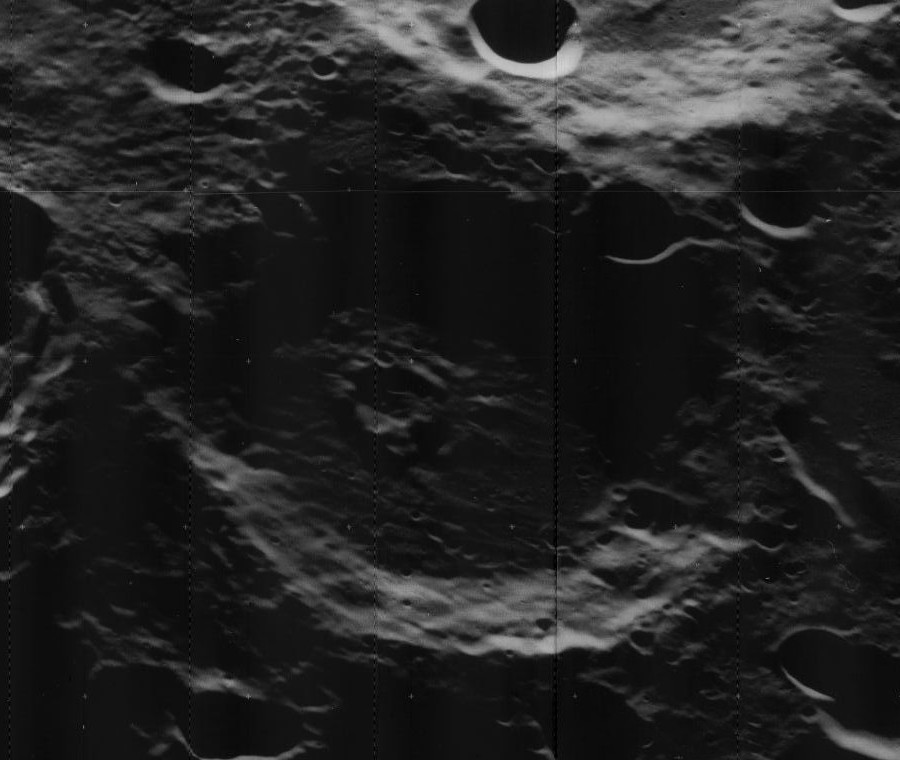
- Oblique Lunar Orbiter 5 image, facing west
- Coordinates: 25.13°N 105.24°W
- Diameter: 87.62 km (54.44 mi)
- Depth: Unknown
- Colongitude: 106° at sunrise
- Eponym: Lloyd V. Berkner

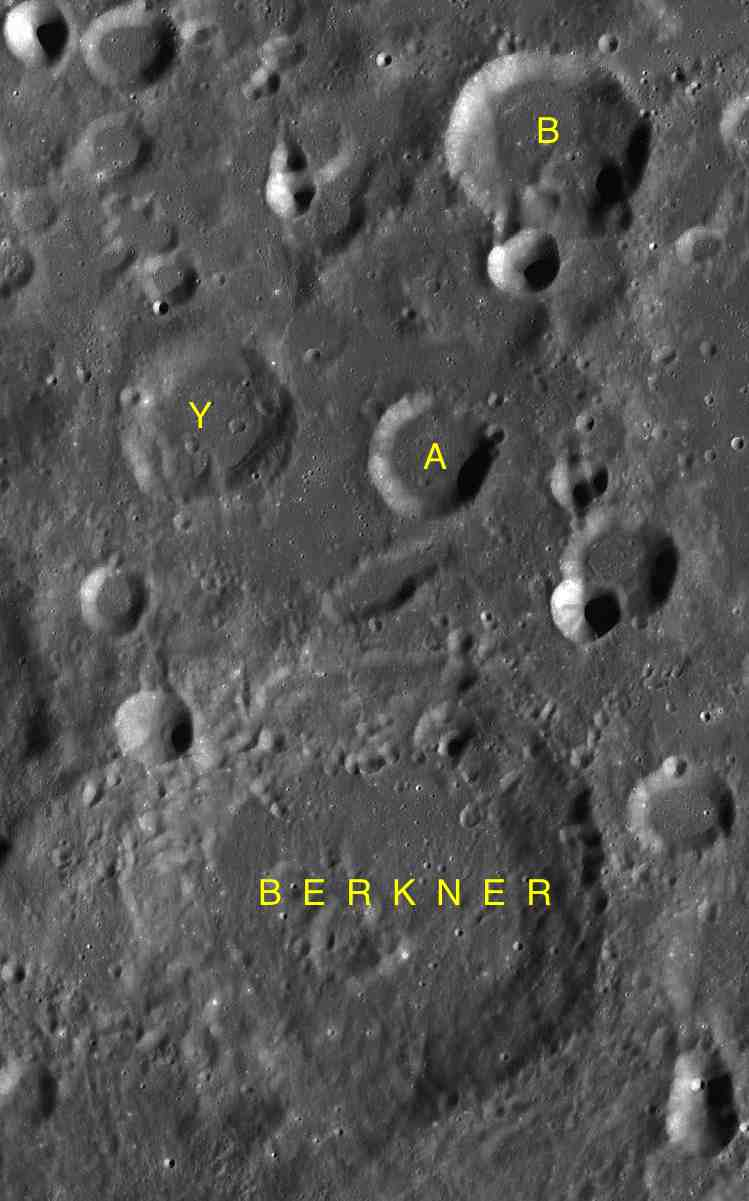
Satellite craters of Berkner

Berkner is a lunar impact crater that is located on the far side of the Moon, just past the western limb. It is attached to the east-southeast rim of the crater Parenago. Just to the south is the Robertson, and to the southeast is Helberg.

The outer rim of this crater has been worn and eroded, particularly along the northwest half where a small crater overlays the outer rim. The most intact part of the rim is to the southeast, while the remainder has been impacted and notched by smaller impacts, and to the southwest overlain by material. The spectra of the central peak fits an anorthositic norite mineralogy, which originated from a depth of 8.6 to 13.6 km.

This crater was named after American geophysicist Lloyd V. Berkner (1905–1967). Prior to its formal naming by the International Astronomical Union in 1970, Berkner was called Crater 176.

== Satellite craters ==
By convention these features are identified on lunar maps by placing the letter on the side of the crater midpoint that is closest to Berkner.

Berkner	Latitude	Longitude	Diameter
A	27.6° N	104.8° W	22 km
B	29.3° N	104.1° W	33 km
Y	27.8° N	106.2° W	31 km
