= Comrie (crater) =

Lunar impact crater

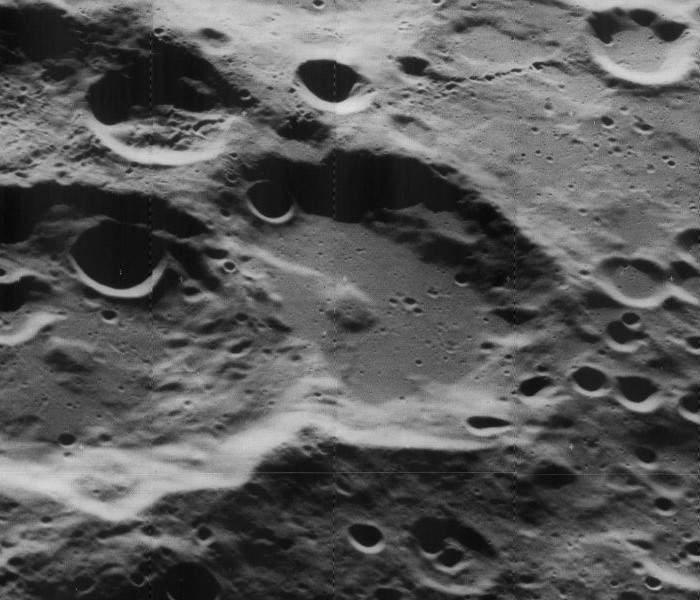
- Oblique Lunar Orbiter 5 image, facing west, showing Comrie (center) and Comrie K (left)
- Coordinates: 23.3°N 112.7°W
- Diameter: 59.25 km (36.82 mi)
- Depth: Unknown
- Colongitude: 113° at sunrise
- Eponym: Leslie J. Comrie

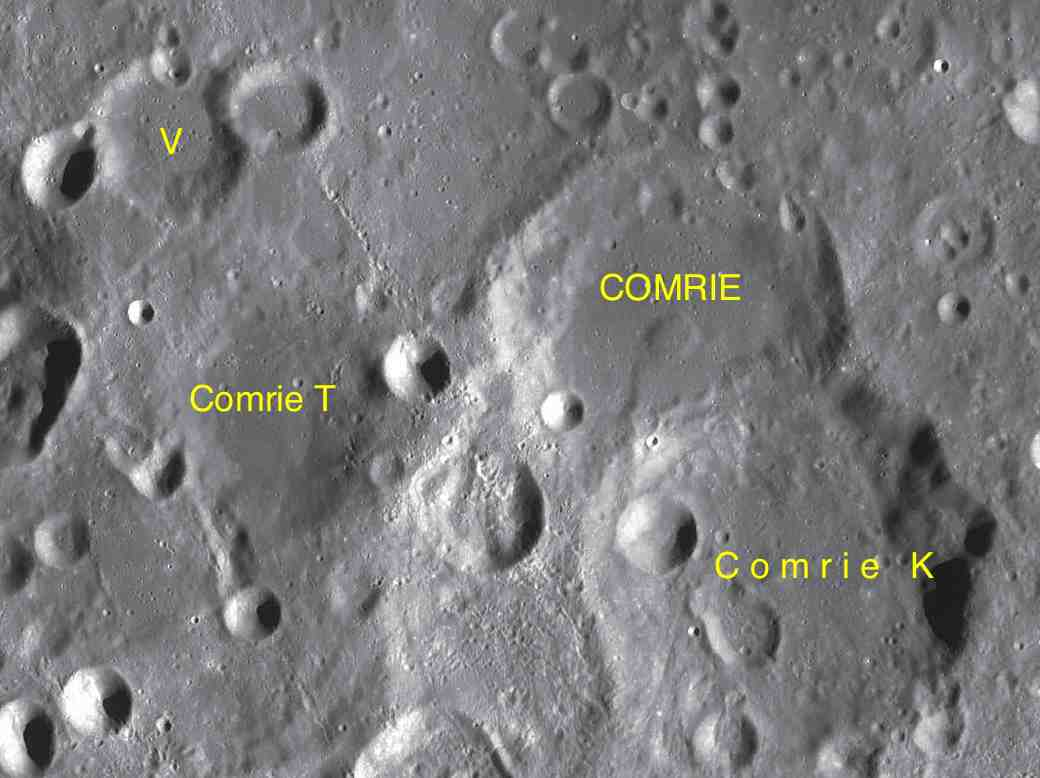
Satellite features

Comrie is a degraded lunar impact crater situated on the rugged far side of the Moon, beyond the western limb, making it hidden from Earth. It is located in a region surrounded by other notable craters, with Ohm to the south-southwest, Shternberg to the southwest, and Parenago to the northeast.

Comrie is the northern member of a formation consisting of three connected craters. The southern part of Comrie is attached to a slightly larger crater, Comrie K, sharing a nearly straight rim between them. The southern portion of Comrie K's rim merges with the northern part of a larger, heavily worn crater. At what would be the midpoint of Comrie is a low central plateau. There are small impacts along the northeast inner wall of Comrie, and a relatively fresh impact along the southwest inner wall.

This crater is named after New Zealand and British astronomer Leslie J. Comrie (1893–1950). Its designation was officially adopted by the International Astronomical Union in 1970.

== Satellite craters ==
By convention these features are identified on lunar maps by placing the letter on the side of the crater midpoint that is closest to Comrie.

Comrie	Latitude	Longitude	Diameter
K	22.1° N	112.3° W	73 km
T	23.1° N	115.3° W	43 km
V	24.6° N	115.9° W	29 km
