= Edison Gower-Bell Telephone Company of Europe =

The Edison Gower-Bell Telephone Company of Europe, Ltd. was organized on October 28, 1881. Its areas of operations covered all of continental Europe, excluding France, Turkey, and Greece.

It was established to control the patents and business interests of Alexander Graham Bell, Thomas Edison, and Frederic Allan Gower of the United States, who had previously held a Bell Telephone Company franchise in New England in the early 1880s.
