= Alexander Graham Bell School (Chicago) =

Public school in Illinois, United States

Bell School
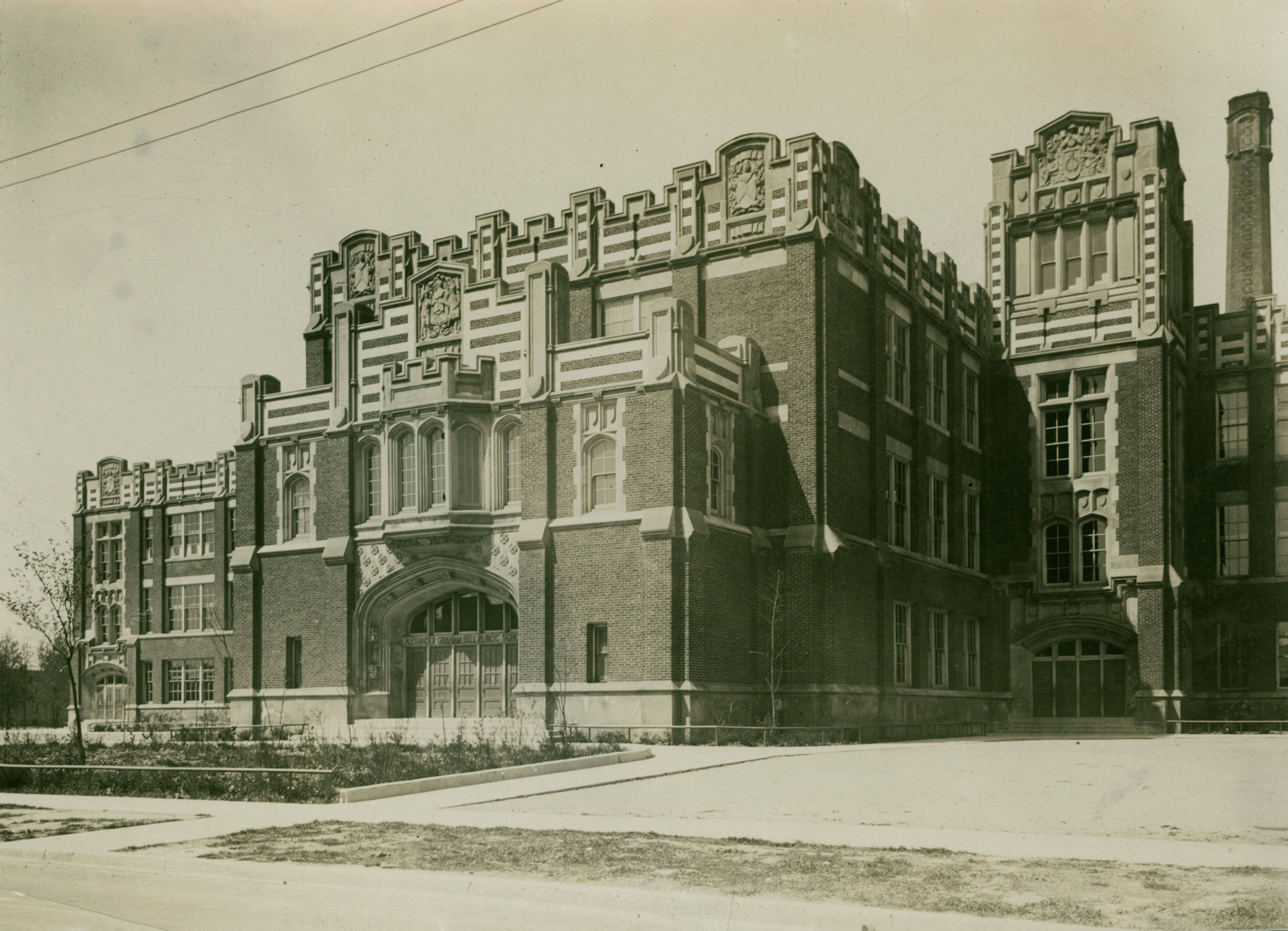
- Alexander Graham Bell Elementary School, Chicago, May 1919

Location
- 3730 North Oakley Avenue; Chicago, Illinois; United States; 41°56′58″N 87°41′12″W

Information
- Type: Public Elementary
- Established: 1917
- School district: 299
- Principal: Ashley Reyes
- Faculty: 50+
- Grades: K–8
- Enrollment: 1040
- Campus: City
- Colors: Red, White and Black
- Mascot: Blaze
- Website: bell.cps.edu

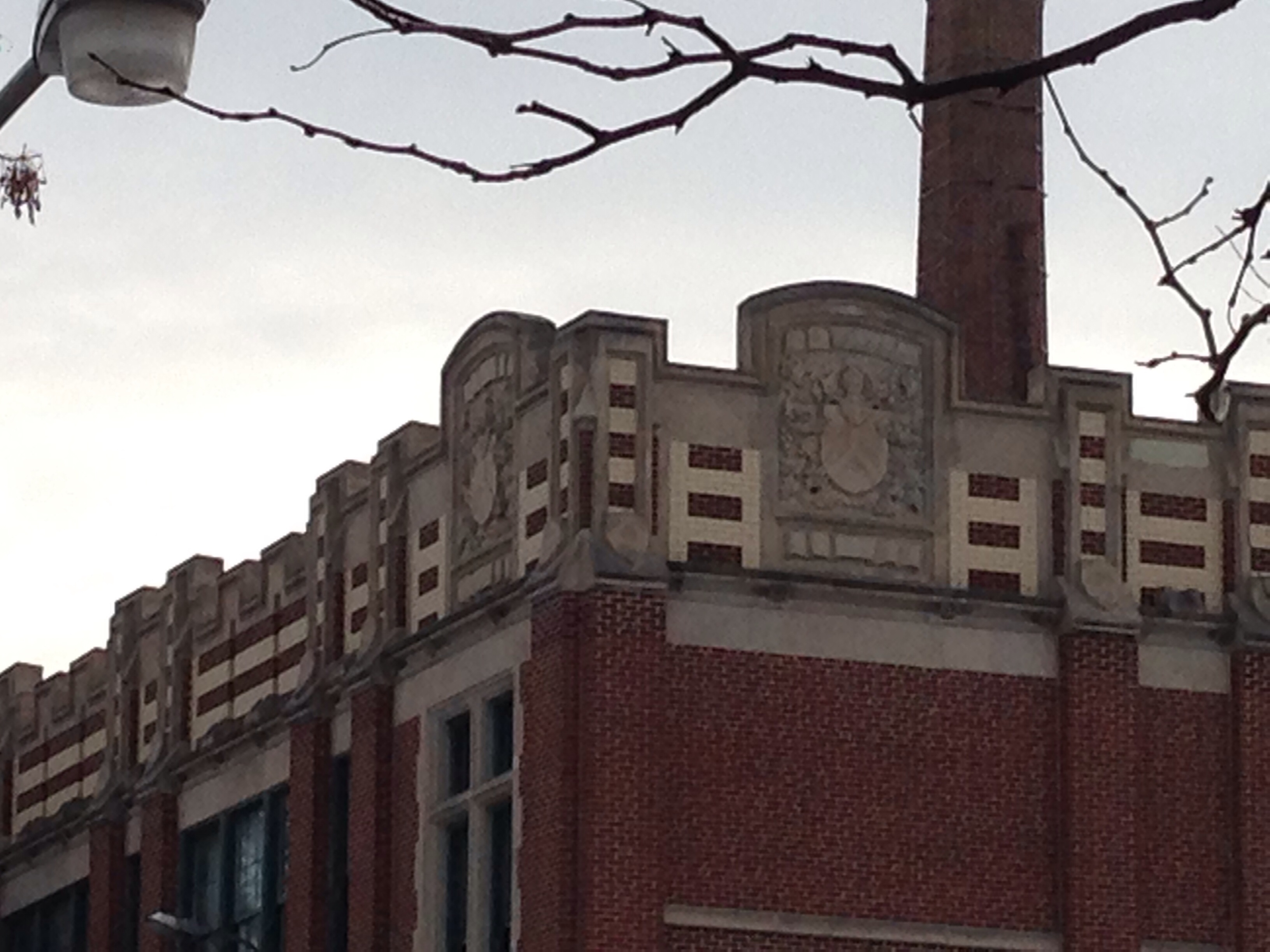
A part of Alexander Graham Bell School featuring a y-shape in the architecture, common in Chicago architecture

Alexander Graham Bell School, also known as Bell School is a public school located in the North Center neighborhood of Chicago, Illinois, United States; it is a part of the Chicago Public Schools. It offers grades kindergarten through grade eight. It also has a deaf department for students in preschool through grade eight and additionally a Regional Gifted Center (Options) for students in grades kindergarten through eight.

The elementary school was founded in 1917 with 24 classrooms for hearing students and 15 classrooms for deaf students, after the Chicago School Board allocated US$285,000 for it in 1915 (approximately $9,070,000 in current dollars).

The school, one of the largest built in the Chicago Public School system at the time, was dedicated on April 1, 1918, by its name source Alexander Graham Bell, advocate of education for deaf students.

== Sports ==
Bell School offers a variety of sports, including basketball, cross country, flag football, soccer, softball, track and field and volleyball.

== Special events ==
Since 2003, Martyrs', a music venue on Lincoln Avenue, has hosted "Bands for Bell" where Bell parent bands play as a fundraiser for Bell.

== See also ==
- Chicago Public Schools
- Clarke School for the Deaf
- Volta Laboratory and Bureau
