= George Allen Davis =

American politician (1857–1920)

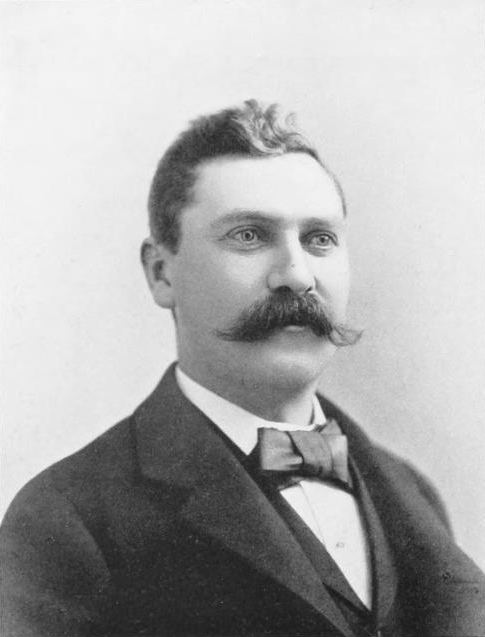
- Born: August 5, 1857
- Died: February 12, 1920 (aged 62)
- Occupation: Lawyer

George Allen Davis (August 5, 1857 – February 12, 1920) was a U.S. lawyer, patron of the arts and a politician from New York.

== Life ==
He was supervisor of the Town of Lancaster from 1888 to 1891, and from 1893 to 1897; and a delegate to the New York State Constitutional Convention of 1894.

He was a member of the New York State Senate from 1896 to 1910, sitting in the 119th, 120th, 121st, 122nd, 123rd, 124th, 125th, 126th, 127th, 128th, 129th (all eleven 49th D.), 130th, 131st, 132nd and 133rd New York State Legislatures (all four 50th D.).

In 1909 Davis was among a trio of finalist judges, including, Sir Byron Edmund Walker of the Canadian Imperial Bank of Commerce in Toronto and Sir George Christie Gibbons of London, Ontario, all patrons of the arts, whom were asked to join the selection committee for the Bell Telephone Memorial and choose the design sculptor for a major Bell Telephone monument in Brantford, Canada.

Davis is buried in his family's mausoleum at Lancaster Rural Cemetery.

Professional baseball pitcher Iron Davis was his son.

== Sources ==
Citations

Bibliography

- Journal of the Constitutional Convention of the State of New York 1894 (Albany, 1895; pg. 14)
- Official New York from Cleveland to Hughes by Charles Elliott Fitch (Hurd Publishing Co., New York and Buffalo, 1911, Vol. IV; pg. 364ff)
- History of Lancaster, NY transcribed from Our County and Its People: A Descriptive History of Erie County, NY by Truman C. White (1898)
- Ex-State Senator George A. Davis in NYT on February 13, 1920

New York State Senate
Preceded by new district	New York State Senate; 49th District; 1896–1906	Succeeded by Samuel J. Ramsperger
Preceded by Albert T. Fancher	New York State Senate; 50th District; 1907–1910	Succeeded by George B. Bird
