= Bell Memorial =

Monument in Brantford, Ontario, Canada

- City of Brantford
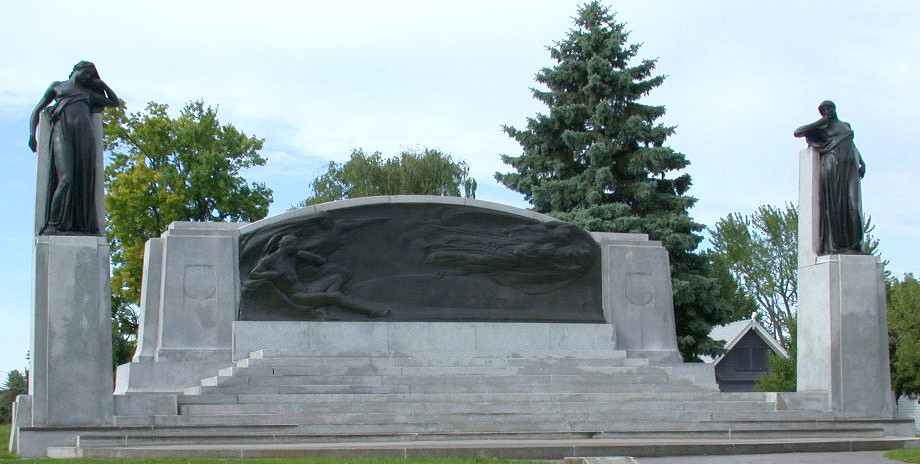
- The frontside of Bell Memorial
- For the invention of the telephone
- Unveiled: 24 October 1917
- Location: 43°8′28″N 80°16′5″W near Brantford, Ontario
- Designed by: Walter Seymour Allward
- Commemorating the invention of the telephone at Brantford by Alexander Graham Bell in 1874

The Bell Memorial (also known as the Bell Monument or Telephone Monument) is a memorial designed by Walter Seymour Allward to commemorate the invention of the telephone by Alexander Graham Bell at the Bell Homestead National Historic Site, in Brantford, Ontario, Canada.

In 1906, the citizens of the Brantford and Brant County areas formed the Bell Telephone Memorial Association, which commissioned the memorial. By 1908, the association's designs committee asked sculptors on two continents to submit proposals for the memorial. The submission by Canadian sculptor Walter Seymour Allward of Toronto won the competition. The memorial was originally scheduled for completion by 1912 but Allward, aided by his studio assistant Emanuel Hahn did not finish it until five years later. The Governor General of Canada, Victor Cavendish, 9th Duke of Devonshire, unveiled the memorial on 24 October 1917.

Allward designed the monument to symbolize the telephone's ability to overcome great distances. A series of steps lead to the main section where the floating allegorical figure of Intelligence appears over a reclining male figure representing Man, transmitting sound through space, discovering his power to transmit sound through space, and also pointing to three floating figures, the messengers of Knowledge, Joy, and Sorrow positioned at the other end of the tableau. Additionally, there are two female figures mounted on granite pedestals representing Humanity positioned to the left and right of the memorial, one sending and the other receiving a message.

The Bell Memorial has been described as the finest example of Allward's early work. The memorial itself has been used as a central fixture for many civic events and remains an important part of Brantford's history. It was provided a heritage designation under the Ontario Heritage Act in 2005 and listed on the Canadian Register of Historic Places in 2009.

== History ==
Alexander Graham Bell conceived the technical aspects of the telephone and invented it in July 1874, while residing with his parents at their farm, Melville House, now a National Historic Site of Canada. (Note: Melville House, a name created by Alexander Melville Bell on his stationery, was at the time part of Tutelo Heights on the outskirts of the City of Brantford, but which was later incorporated within the city.) One of the first successful voice transmissions of any notable distance was made on 4 August 1876, between the telegraph office in Brantford, Ontario and Bell's father's homestead over makeshift wires. He later refined the telephone's design at Brantford after producing his first working prototype in Boston. Canada's first telephone factory, created by James Cowherd, was located in Brantford, and operated from about 1879 to 1881 leading to the informal designation as The Telephone City.

=== Memorial association established ===
Discussion of a monument to commemorate both Bell and his invention was first raised in Brantford in 1904 although the Bell Telephone Memorial Association was not formally established until 1906. After gaining Bell's approval, the association and its proposed memorial were publicly endorsed on 9 March 1906 at a banquet in Brantford Kirby House (later to become the Hotel Kirby), which Bell attended as a guest of honour. That same year the association was formally organized and incorporated by an Act of the Legislature of Ontario with the stated aim of commemorating the invention of the telephone in Brantford and to name Bell as its inventor. What was highly unusual in this instance was the building of an important monument to a living person, an event usually conducted only for imperial leaders. The duality of the monument with its dedication to both the inventor and to his invention, with its emphasis on the latter, likely persuaded Alexander Graham Bell, normally modest, to accept the invitation to its public unveiling.

The association was organized with the support of George, Prince of Wales (later King George V), Viceroy of India and former Governor General of Canada Gilbert Elliot-Murray-Kynynmound, 4th Earl of Minto, and the latter's successor Governor-General Albert Grey, 4th Earl Grey, plus an approximate dozen other prominent leaders in Canada and the United States, who endorsed the project with their backing. Donald Howard, 3rd Baron Strathcona and Mount Royal became its first honorary president and upon his death, he was succeeded by the Prince Arthur, Duke of Connaught and Strathearn, a former Governor General of Canada. William Foster Cockshutt, the local federal Member of Parliament who had originally proposed the memorial in 1904, became the association's president, and was assisted by another MP, Lloyd Harris, who served as vice-president. (Note: The assosation members are itentified as W.F. Cockshutt as President, Lloyd Harrisas Vice-President, George Hateley as Secretary, John Muir as Treasurer, W.N. Andrews, Edward L. Goold, George Kippax, G.H. Muirhead, T.H. Preston, F.D. Reville, A.J. Wilkes, K.C., C.H. Waterous, Brantford Mayor J.W. Bowlby and Warden A.B. Rose) The design selection committee was led by Byron Edmund Walker, a prominent Canadian banker, philanthropist and patron of the arts.

The Association's public appeal quickly raised CA$35,000 within its first months, rising to $44,000 by September 1909, eventually collecting over $65,000 through donations from various citizens worldwide. An additional federal contribution of $10,000 was supported in Canada's parliament by Prime Minister Sir Wilfrid Laurier. (Note: Other significant contributions were made by the 'American Telephone Company' of Boston (possibly referring to the head of the Bell System, AT&T Corp. – $1,000), Col. W.F. Cockshutt, M.P. ($500), Goold, Shapely & Muir ($500), Waterous Engine Works Co. ($500), Verity Plow Company ($500), Mrs. McCormick of Chicago ($500), Bell Telephone Company of Canada ($500), the City of Toronto ($500), and even a long-time personal and business rival of Alexander Graham Bell and Bell Telephone, inventor Thomas Edison, who provide a donation of $250.) In a city with a population of only 30,000, the fundraising needed for the monument was a major accomplishment.

=== Selection committee choice ===
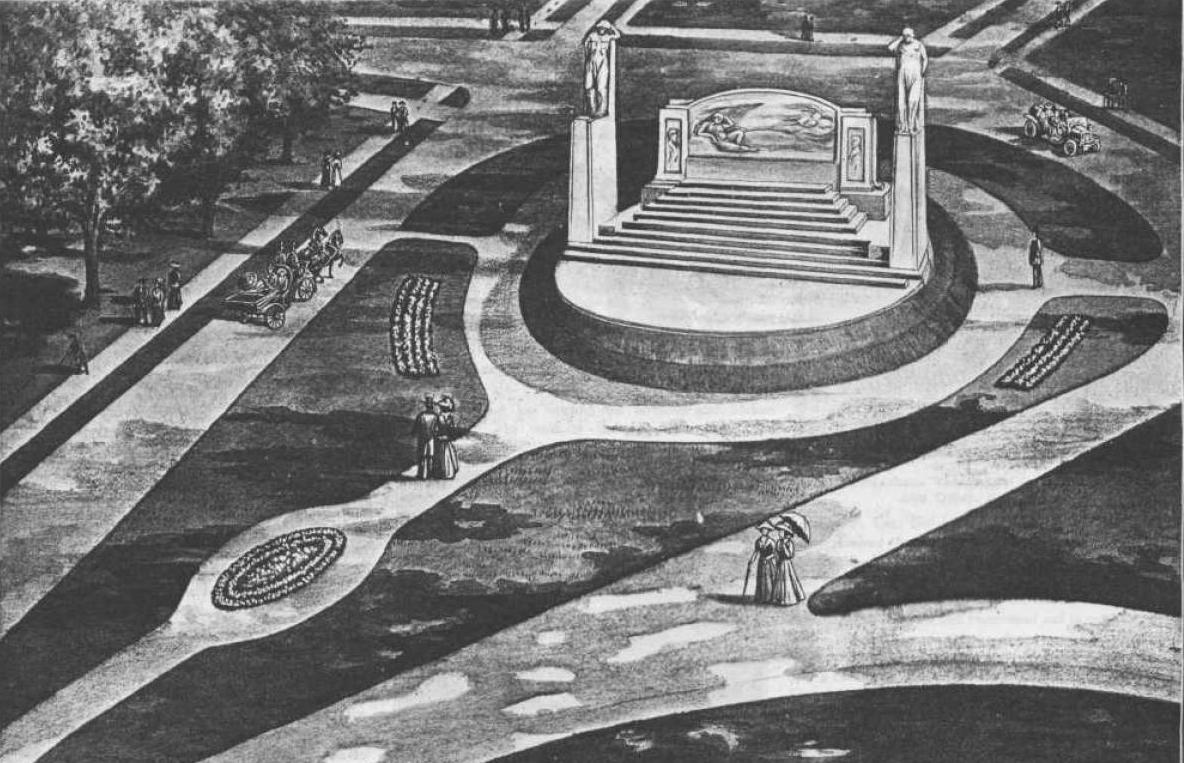
An early concept drawing of the memorial and the Alexander Graham Bell Gardens, c. 1909.

Invitations were sent out to 22 sculptors in Europe, the United States and Canada in 1908, inviting them to submit models for the proposed monument. By May 1909 either nine or ten models had been submitted. (Note: The Whitaker booklet states nine models, while Elgin-Balfour writes that ten models were submitted to the committee. After the competition's completion, five of the plaster models were deposited at the Bell Homestead.) A designs committee was appointed by the association and selected the three best designs they favored from the models submitted. The committee asked a trio of outside judges, Sir Byron Edmund Walker of the Canadian Imperial Bank of Commerce in Toronto, New York State Senator George Allen Davis of Buffalo and Sir George Christie Gibbons of London, Ontario to make a final decision, all of whom were considered patrons of the arts. After consideration a unanimous choice was made to award the commission to Walter Seymour Allward. (Note: The committee's second and third choices were for the designs submitted by G.W. Hill of Montreal, and A.E. Pausch of Buffalo, N.Y. who worked with designs of Castar Craun of Berlin, Ontario.) The millionaire banker and philanthropist Sir Byron Walker was likely persuasive in swaying the unanimous decision to the sculptor. Walker had earlier contacted a prominent Brantford banker, praising Allward's previous works, and advised him that "because of the national character of the work I am particularly interested in the best possible outcome artistically".

=== Lengthy delays and completion ===
The commission award for the memorial had been made in 1908 and a contract to Allward authorized in 1909, based on an initial cost estimate of $25,000 with the provision that the work would be completed by 1912. Also in 1909 the association purchased Alexander Melville Bell's former homestead and farm, Melville House, and transferred its ownership to the City of Brantford for conversion into a museum.

Allward was assisted by his studio assistant, Emanuel Otto Hahn, another highly notable sculptor who worked on the monument with him until 1912 when Hahn left for the Ontario College of Art. The project proceeded slowly in part due to Allward's concurrent work on several other commissions at the same time, including the South African War Memorial, a major monument erected in Toronto. In April 1915 Allward reported to the committee that the two heroic figures to be mounted on pedestals had been successfully cast and that foundation work for the site had been tendered. But in regards to the central bronze casting, which was to become the largest ever created in North America up to that point, he could not estimate when it would be complete, writing in a letter "I am giving all my time to it; I cannot do more. It is an important panel and cannot be too well done". For various reasons the memorial was not completed until 1917, with World War I, material shortages, an embargo on exports of French moulding sand and transportation limitations creating lengthy delays.

=== Unveiling of the Memorial ===
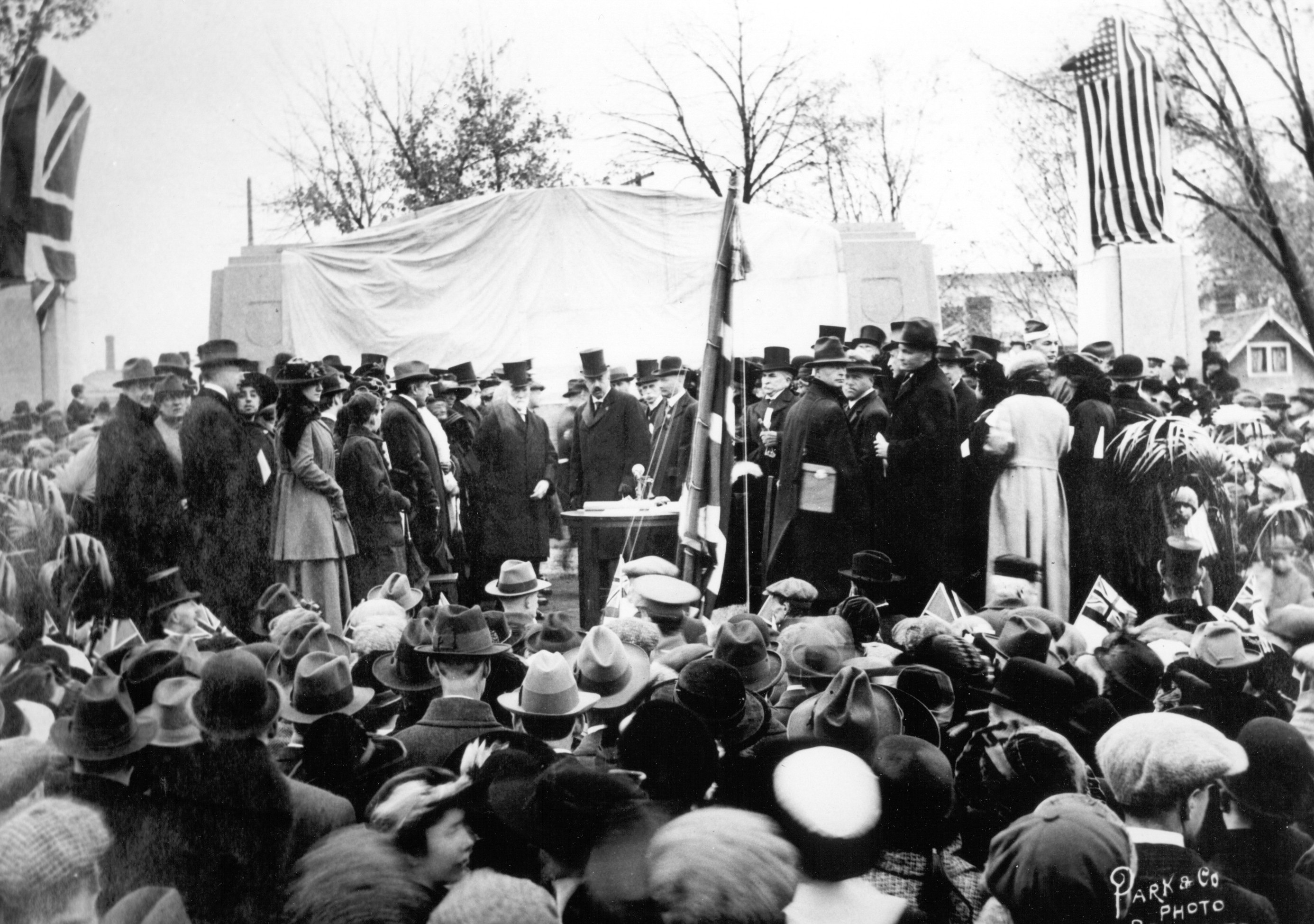
The unveiling of the Bell Memorial in October 1917, with Bell and dignitaries.

The Brantford monument was finally unveiled in a driving rain on 24 October 1917 by then Governor General of Canada Victor Cavendish, 9th Duke of Devonshire before an audience in the thousands. The Governor General of Canada arrived in the city by train, along with the Lieutenant-Governor of Ontario Sir John Hendrie, the Hon. Senator Robertson of the Privy Council, the Hon. W.D. McPherson of the Ontario Government and other notables. They were greeted by a children's chorus, honour guards, the band of the 125th (Brantford) Battalion and the chimes of Grace Anglican Church located only a few dozen metres from the memorial. Also in attendance in full war regalia was Chief A.R. Hill of the Six Nations Tribes of the Grand River, where Bell, not long after his arrival in Canada, had been made an honorary tribal chief. (Note: Not long after the extended Bell family arrived in Canada, Alexander Graham discovered the Six Nations Reserve across the river at Onondaga, where he learned the Mohawk language and translated its unwritten vocabulary into Visible Speech symbols. For his work, Bell was awarded the title of Honorary Chief and participated in a ceremony where he donned a Mohawk headdress and performed traditional dances.)

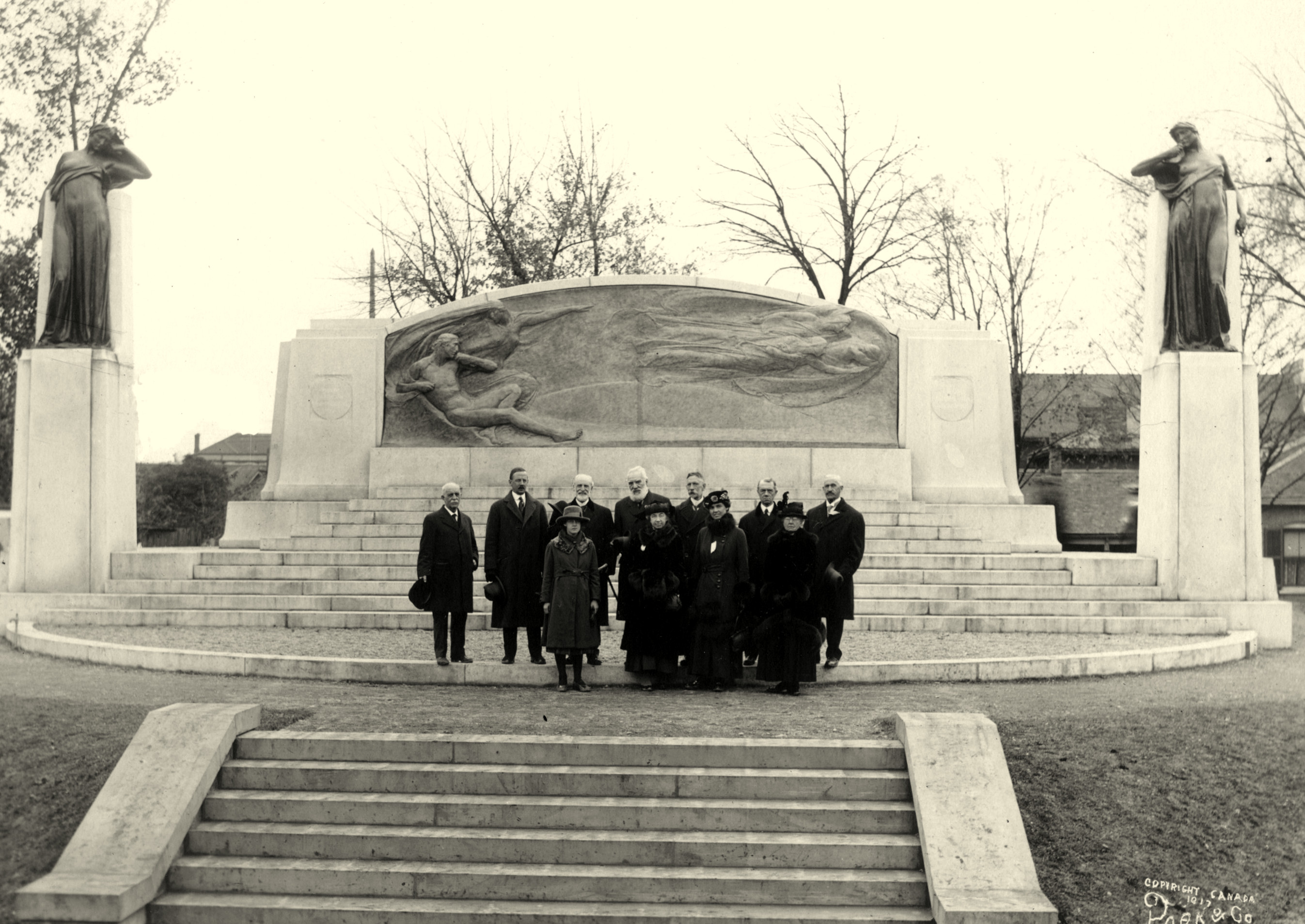
Bell in centre, with committee members, his granddaughter, Mabel Harlakenden Grosvenor; his wife, Mabel Hubbard; and his eldest daughter Elsie.

As a public holiday had been declared for the unveiling, the city's normal activities were shut down for the entire day. After the Governor-General completed his address at the monument and unveiled its shrouds, he withdrew to the city's Old Opera House due to the driving rain, along with large numbers of the crowd. The ceremonies were continued indoors in the city's opera theatre, with Bell addressing the audience again twice more at both the opera house and during a formal reception meal held at the Kerby House. Others spoke with Bell, including his former associate from the Aerial Experiment Association, J.A.D. McCurdy, Gilbert Grosvenour, president of the National Geographic Society, and other dignitaries.

Alexander Graham Bell (in both of his addresses that day) reminded the attendees that "Brantford is right in claiming the invention of the telephone here... [which was] conceived in Brantford in 1874 and born in Boston in 1875", and later addressing the Duke, said "...on behalf of the Association ...in presenting to His Excellency [with] a silver telephone... I hope that in using it he will remember that the telephone originated in Brantford and that the first transmission to a distance was made between Brantford and Paris." (Note: The silver telephone Bell presented to the Governor General of Canada was identical to one presented earlier in 1901 by Bell's father, Alexander Melville Bell, to the Prince of Wales (later King George V) in Brantford, during the prince's visit to Canada.) In appreciation to the people of Brantford, Bell's wife, Mabel Hubbard Bell, made a contribution of $500 to the city's support fund for its soldiers then fighting in Europe.

== Memorial ==
At the time of its unveiling, the memorial was one of the most impressive monuments of the day in Canada, designed to depict the vast distances on the Earth being "annihilated" by the telephone. The allegorical style of the monument's figures depicts several aspects of the telephone in its worldwide use. Its most striking feature is its broad, main bronze cast panel, approximately seven and a half metres wide and two and a half metres high, which portray "....the elusive dream of the inventor's youth—Inspiration whispering to Man, his power to transmit sound through space. (Note: The bronze tableau contains three figures in alto-rilievo relief and measures approximately 773 centimetres in width by 250 centimetres in height. According to documents, its casting process 'taxed' the existing foundry capabilities of the era.) Three ephemeral ghostly figures, two of which are cast in mid-relief and one in high (alto-rilievo) relief, depict Knowledge, Joy and Sorrow, transmitted to man by the telephone. Two heroic figures flanking the broad flight of steps leading up to the monument symbolize humanity sending and receiving a message."

The Memorial is located within the Bell Memorial Gardens of Bell Memorial Park at 41 West Street in the City of Brantford. The monument itself is located on a gore of land forming a near-triangularly shaped public park. The triangular plot of land in front of the monument was transformed into a park, with its embankments being sodded. The panel in front of the gore which contains the monument is a smaller gore which has been artistically laid out as a park, the entire area being named as the Bell Memorial Gardens.

=== The model of Man, transmitting sound through space ===
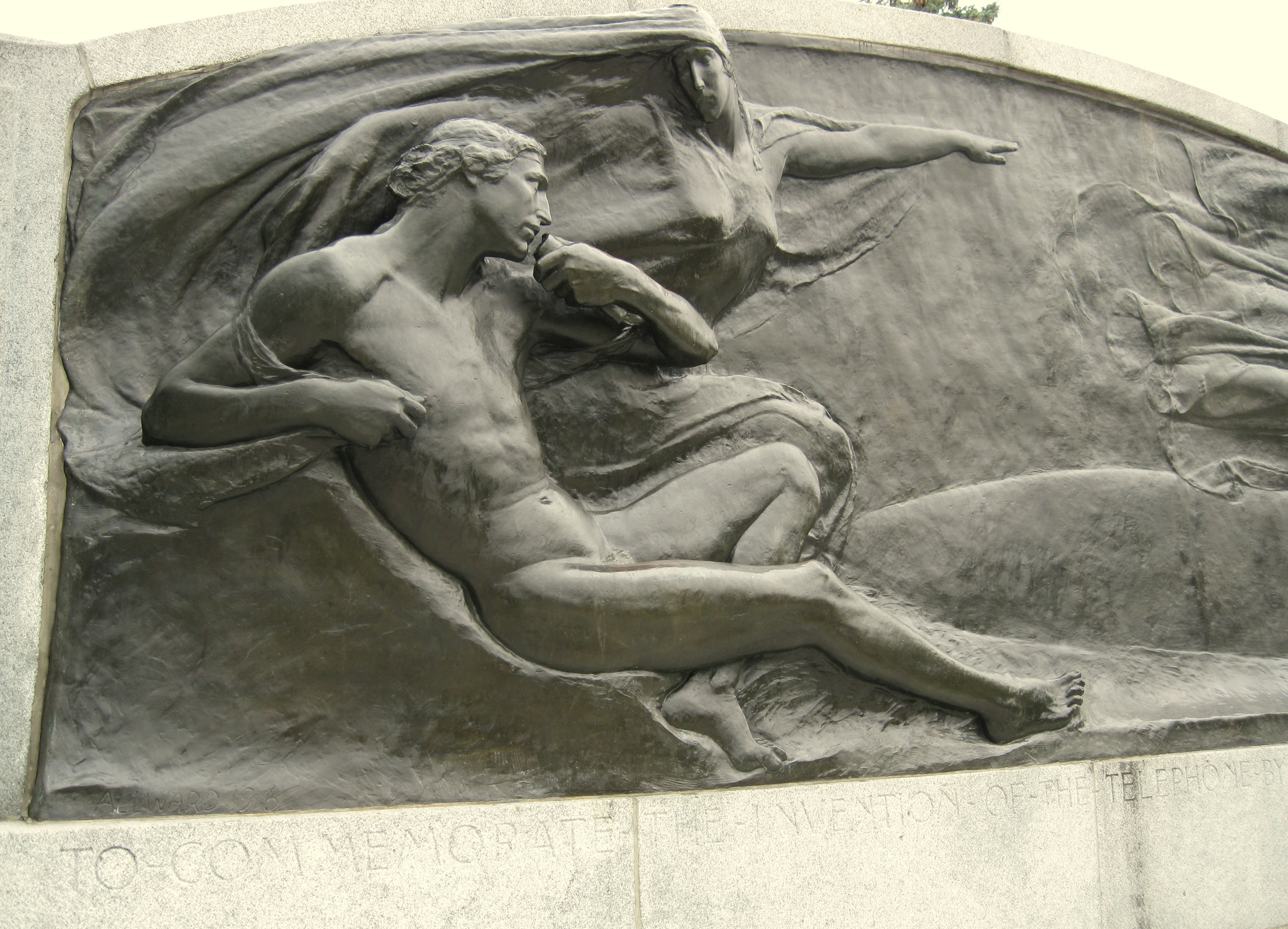
Allegorical 'Inspiration' and 'Man', communicating, with the vastness of the Earth depicted by the curvatures on its cast bronze panel.

The model for 'Man, discovering his power to transmit sound through space' was Cyril William George Kinsella, a wounded war veteran and a former resident of Brantford. Kinsella served as Allward's nude model representing Man after being severely injured in the European conflict. Born in the UK he had become one of approximately 100,000 disadvantaged British children and orphans, a "Home Child", sent to Canada and other Commonwealth countries to find better lives in the late 19th and early 20th centuries. After arriving in Ontario in 1908 he resided in a series of Fegan Homes (named after James William Condell Fegan of Britain), including one in Toronto where he likely later met Allward. Kinsella eventually settled in Brantford County to perform farmwork. Underaged, but a healthy 178 centimetres (5 ft 10 in) in height in 1914, he enlisted in Brantford's 125th Battalion for service overseas where he fought in Belgium and France with the Canadian Expeditionary Force during World War I.

Kinsella was wounded and shell-shocked at the Second Battle of Ypres in Belgium and, after being invalided and discharged back to Canada in 1916, met Allward in Toronto while convalescing and then worked as his model, saying later "The posing was exacting and took about two months." Kinsella subsequently became bored with civilian life and reenlisted with the Canadian Army, returning to Europe. He was serving with the 1st Canadian Division, Fourth Battalion near the northern French village of St. Marie Chappell at the time of the memorial's unveiling in Brantford. He later returned to Canada at the end of the war, but did not view himself on the memorial until 27 years later, in May 1946.

=== Other monument features ===
At the memorial's crest is a series of steps leading to the main portion of the monument, a wide mass of white Stanstead granite, faced by the largest single bronze casting created up to that time, which taxed the capacity of its foundry. The sculptor sought to bring out, as the dominant note, the discovery by man of his power to transmit sound through space. Above the reclining figure of man is Inspiration, (Note: Most literature refers to this figure as Inspiration, however in an explanation of the complex allegories by Sir Edmund Walker, he named the figure surmounting Man, discovering his power to transmit vocal sounds through space as Intelligence.) urging him on to greater endeavors, while, at the other end of the panel are the messengers of Knowledge, Joy and Sorrow, communicating to man by telephone. On both sides of the main portion of the monument are two "heroic" female figures representing humanity in bronze on granite mounts, one depicted in the act of sending, the other of receiving a message over the telephone. The two female figures were positioned some distance apart in order to denote the telephone's power to traverse great distances. Uniting the entire work together is the line of the earth's curvature on the bronze casting, depicting the extent of the telephone's worldwide use. Allward's original proposed design for the monument also included the flags of the greatest nations of the world, a modern element that was likely omitted as it would detract from the monument's neoclassical design.

The rear side of the monument contains a small stone foundation with bullfrog gargoyles; while cut in the stone, on pilasters, are representations of the British Crown and the Maple Leaf. On the rear, also, was placed a bronze plaque giving the names of the patrons and the executive committee of the Association. In the present day the plaque is now found on the side of the rightmost granite mount for one of the heroic figures. The foundation, steps, pedestals and walls are composed of durable Stanstead granite. On the main portion, to the right and left, two circular panels are inscribed: "Hoc Opus Machinae Patri Dedicatum Est" (this monument has been dedicated to the author of the invention) and "Mundus Telephonici Usu Recreatus Est." (the world has been recreated using the telephone). Beneath the central bronze casting is a large carved inscription: "To commemorate the invention of the telephone by Alexander Graham Bell in Brantford 1874." Upon its public unveiling the Bell Memorial created a stir of controversy with its abstract allegorical interpretations. Upon first viewing the bronze tableau, one observer in the crowds remarked on the two main figures on its left side, Man the Inventor and Inspiration. "It looks to me..." he spoke to his friend, "...like an angel trying to pull along a pig-headed Englishman." The monument also launched its designer-sculptor to fame. It was designed and crafted under Walter Seymour Allward (1875–1955), likely Canada's best monumental sculptor of the era. (Note: The National Gallery of Canada writes of Allard: "Walter Allward (1875–1955) was probably Canada's most important monumental sculptor in the first third of this century ... his most notable early success was the Alexander Graham Bell Monument (1908–1917) in Brantford, Ontario.") Besides the Bell Memorial he created numerous other important monumental works, his greatest being the Canadian National Vimy Memorial in Pas-de-Calais, France, commemorating Canada's sacrifices and human losses in the First World War, a project he worked on 16 years until its completion in 1936. The Bell Memorial is located within the Bell Memorial Gardens, a small park in downtown Brantford, in an area originally slated to be the city's new municipal centre, but which was subsequently built further away. Other names considered for the park but which were not accepted included Bell Circle, Graham Bell Park and Prince George Park.

== Reception ==
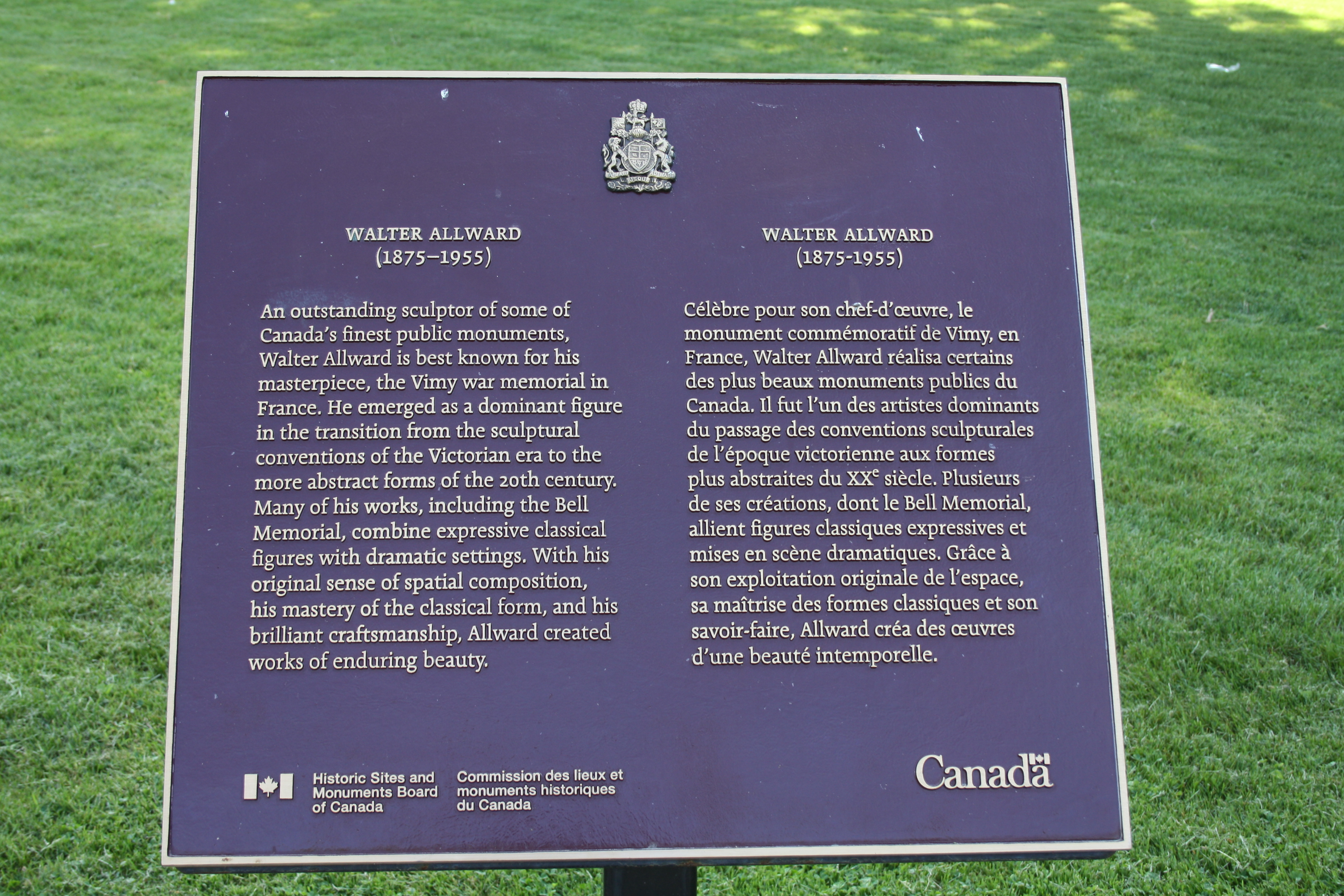
Historic Sites and Monuments Board of Canada plaque added in 2010 honouring Allward's work.

Allward's memorial has been described as "a tour de force". One resident described the imagery of the oversized figures on its bronze panel, saying that it "...depicts a mythical passing of the spark of communication from the hands of the gods to the hands of humans". The memorial has served as an important gathering point, landmark and commemoration site for Brantford, used to rally people for fund-raising events, marches and civic events. At the Armistice of World War I, it became a spontaneous gathering point for celebration. It was also used to help raise funds for Brantford's First World War Cenotaph, another of Walter Allward's works.

The memorial received historical designation for its cultural heritage value, by the City of Brantford on 31 October 2005, under the Ontario Heritage Act. It was also designated and listed on the Canadian Register of Historic Places on 12 January 2009. In 2010 both Parks Canada and the Historic Sites and Monuments Board of Canada celebrated Allward's work by affixing a plaque to the monument honouring the sculptor himself. It noted Allward's designation as a person of national historic significance due to his "...original sense of spatial composition, his mastery of the classical form and his brilliant craftsmanship."

== See also ==
- Alexander Graham Bell honors and tributes
- Alexander Graham Bell National Historic Site, Baddeck, Cape Breton, Nova Scotia
- Spirit of Communication, statue and symbol of AT&T
- Thomas Cowherd, who helped establish Canada's first telephone factory
