= Waterous Company =

Waterous Company is an American manufacturer of fire pumps, hydrants and fire suppression equipment. Based in South St Paul, Minnesota. Originally part of Waterous Engine Works Co. Ltd, the fire equipment operation in Winnipeg was relocated to St Paul, Minnesota in 1886
