= Bell Homestead National Historic Site =

Canadian national historic site

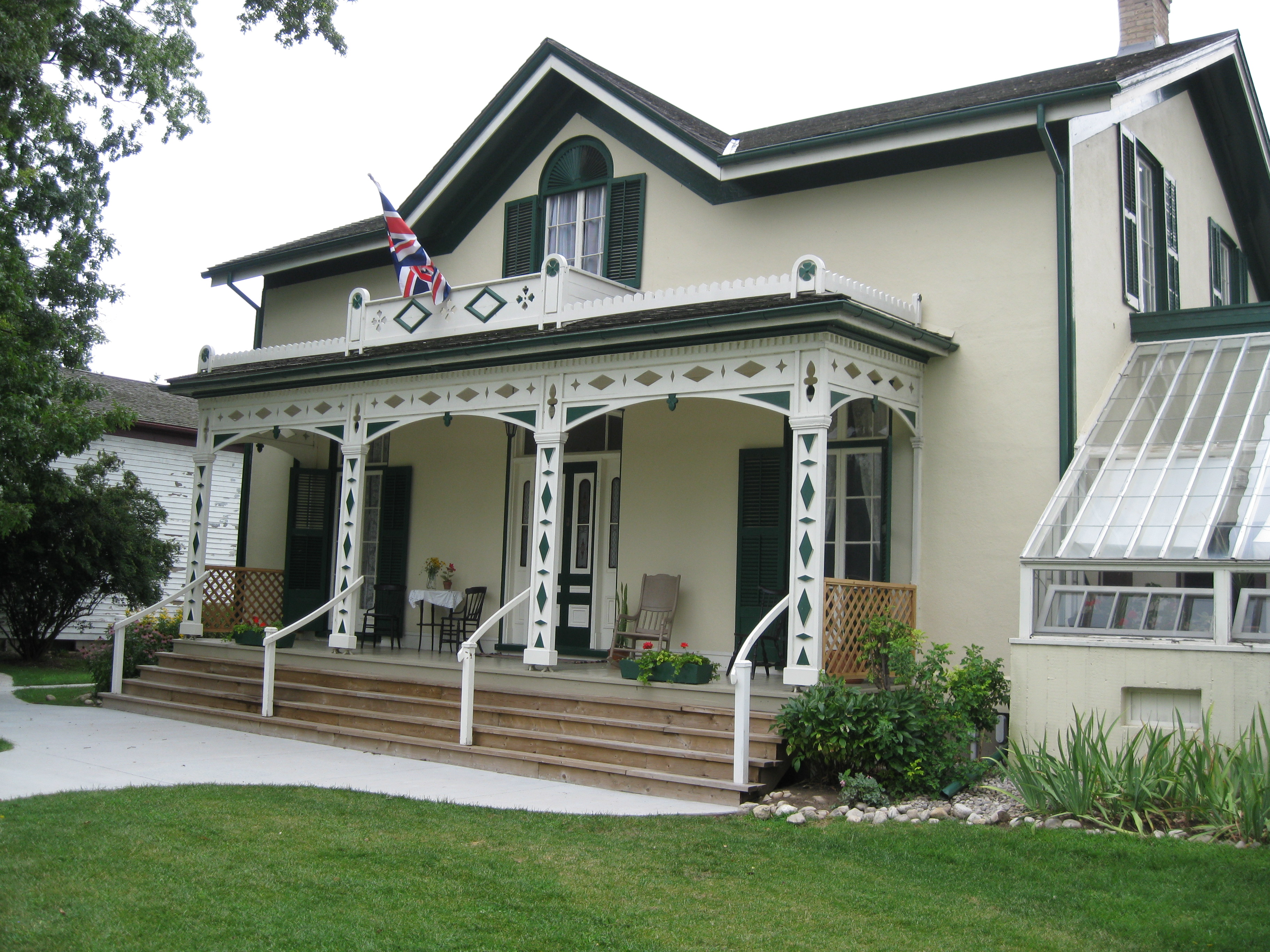
- Melville House at the Bell Homestead National Historic Site, Alexander Graham Bell's first home in North America

- Location in southern Ontario
- Established: 1910
- Location: 94 Tutela Heights Road Brantford, Ontario
- Coordinates: 43°06′27″N 80°16′13.5″W
- Owners: Parks & Recreation Department, City of Brantford
- Website: www.bellhomestead.ca

National Historic Site of Canada
- Official name: Bell Homestead National Historic Site
- Designated: 1996

The Bell Homestead National Historic Site, located in Brantford, Ontario, Canada, also known by the name of its principal structure, Melville House, was the first North American home of Professor Alexander Melville Bell and his family, including his last surviving son, scientist Alexander Graham Bell. The younger Bell conducted his earliest experiments in North America there, and later invented the telephone at the Homestead in July 1874. In a 1906 speech to the Brantford Board of Trade, Bell commented on the telephone's invention: "the telephone problem was solved, and it was solved at my father's home".

The approximately 4-hectare (101/2 acre) site has been largely restored to its appearance when the Bells lived there in the 1870s, and Melville House now serves as a museum to the family and to the invention of the telephone. A large visitor reception centre has also been added adjacent to Melville House.

The Henderson Home building was later added to the Homestead in 1969, being moved there from its original location in downtown Brantford. It was Canada's first telephone company business office, opened in 1877 as a predecessor of the Bell Telephone Company of Canada. After being moved to the Bell Homestead it was converted into an adjunct museum on the development of telephone technology. The Homestead is operated by the Bell Homestead Committee of the City of Brantford.

The Homestead was named a National Historic Site on June 1, 1996, and was listed on the national Register of Historic Places on June 22, 2009. The replacement for a federal commemorative plaque was unveiled the following year by Queen Elizabeth II during the 150th anniversary year celebrations for the birth of Alexander Graham Bell. Melville House has been described as "... this shrine, where lingers the spirit of the great inventor".

== History ==
The Bell Homestead period began with the arrival of the Bell family in the summer of 1870 from their native Scotland, where two of their sons had died of tuberculosis and their middle son, Alexander Graham Bell, was additionally stricken and being consumed by disease. The Bell Homestead complex in the present day consists of several buildings with their own origins. The principal building at the site is Alexander Melville Bell's farmhouse, Melville House, along with its related greenhouse conservatory, outbuildings and fruit orchard. The farmhouse and its farmland were acquired for preservation as a museum in 1909. The Henderson Home, which had served as Canada's first telephone business office in downtown Brantford, was later moved to the site in 1969 and renovated extensively in 1970, to convert it into a separate telephone museum under the principal sponsorship of the county's largest telephone carrier, Bell Canada. As well, a tea house, a visitor reception centre with a mini audio-video theatre and related facilities were also added to the homestead to accommodate visitors and tour groups. The Tutelo migrated to the Six Nations Reserve after their 1753 adoption into the Cayuga. Their longhouse was across the street from the Bell Homestead.

=== Father and son ===
Professor Alexander Melville Bell, a Scottish-born British authority on speech and elocution, immigrated to Canada by steamship in July 1870 with his family and daughter-in-law, who had been widowed by the death of Bell's eldest son from tuberculosis in May of that year. The family's youngest son Edward had similarly died of tuberculosis three years earlier, and during their departure from the British Isles their middle son Alexander Graham now appeared to be faltering from the same disease.

Upon landing at Quebec City on 1 August 1870, the Bells transferred to another steamer to Montreal, and then took the Grand Trunk Railway to Paris, Ontario, residing at the parsonage of the Reverend Thomas Philip Henderson. Henderson was a Baptist minister and close family friend who likely went to school with Melville in Scotland, and who had previously invited the Bell family to immigrate to Canada. After a brief stay of only a few days with the Hendersons, the Bell family purchased a homestead of 51/4 hectares (13 acres) (Note: Various sources quote different sizes for the farm that Melville purchased (using the Imperial 'acre' unit of area measurement) of between 101/2 and 13 acres. Erosion of the farmland along the side of the Grand River is probably the reason for the differing sizes, with the farmland as purchased in 1870 (or earlier) likely the larger size.) at Tutelo Heights (in the present day called Tutela Heights, named for the First Nations band that had previously settled the area), on the outskirts of Brantford, Ontario, for CA$2,600 (approximately CA$106,500 in current dollars), with $2,100 being paid immediately. They were likely assisted in their search by the advance efforts of Reverend Henderson, who was also employed as a school board inspector. At the time of the Bell family's departure from the UK, Alexander Graham's health was threateningly poor, with "a chest condition... giving cause for concern" and his tall, broad-framed body being reduced to 59 kg (130 lb), leaving his face gaunt. (Note: Various sources state that Alexander Graham was suffering from tuberculosis (TB—the same disease that killed his two brothers and his eldest brother's only child in the UK), while others are vague as to his ailment. Biographer Charlotte Gray stated that at the time of the Graham's move to Canada, "all the signs" of tuberculosis were there and that his overall condition was grave enough that he believed he would soon die.)

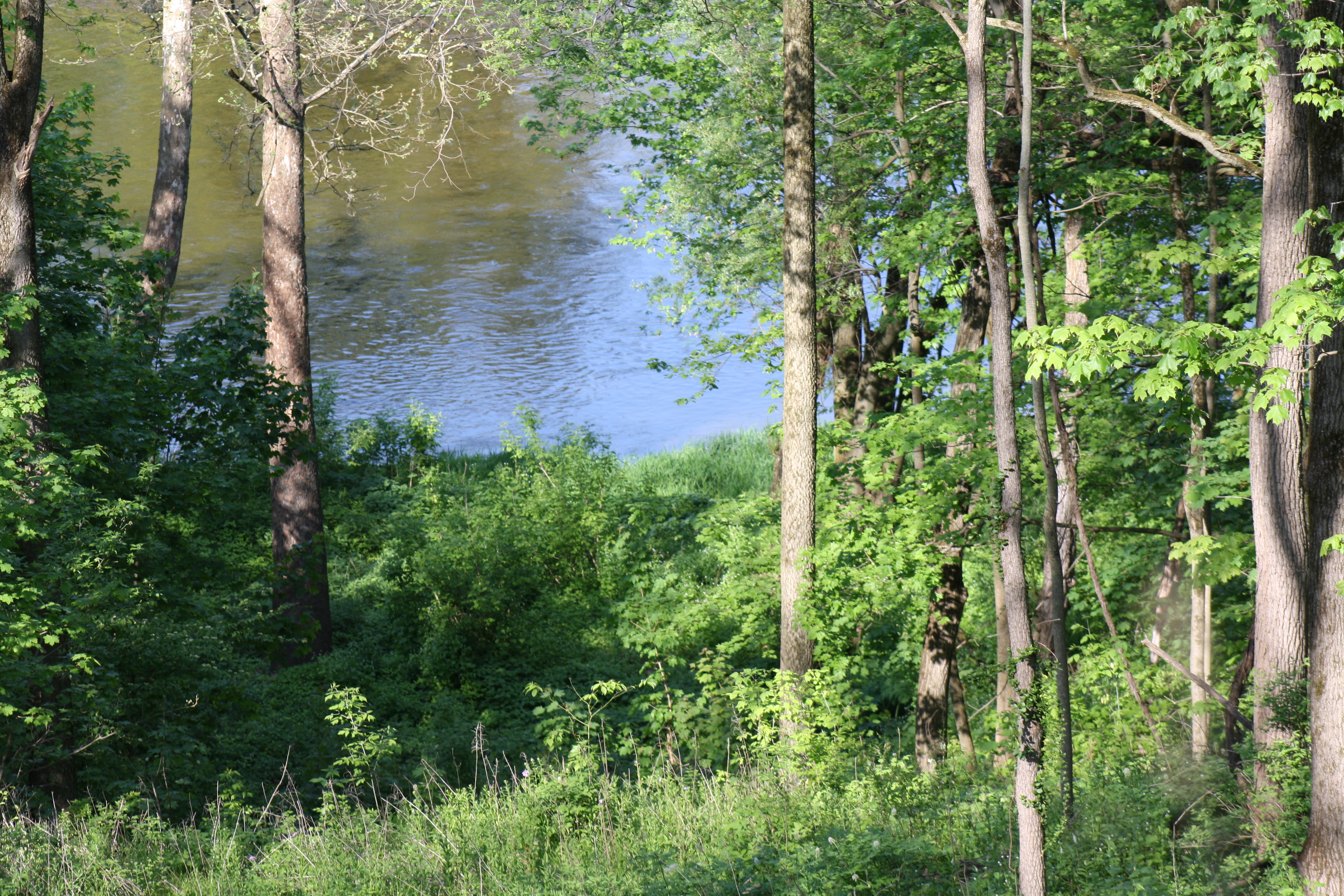
The view close to Alexander Graham Bell's "dreaming place" behind Melville House, where he contemplated the undulating ripples of Ontario's Grand River and would later write the draft specifications of the telephone patent.

The city's largest newspaper, the Brantford Expositor, soon announced the Bell family's arrival, writing that it was "... pleased to welcome to our town and neighbourhood A. Melville Bell, Esq., Professor of Elocution, of University College, London [...who...] has purchased from Robert Morton a property containing 10.5 acres of land with a good orchard, beautifully situated on the Mt. Pleasant road some two miles from Brantford". At their new home Melville's surviving son Alexander Graham Bell created his laboratory inside the farm's converted carriage house, nearby to what he called his "dreaming place", a large hollow nestled in the elm trees at the back of the property, above the river where he could view its surface. Despite his frail condition upon arriving in Canada, Alexander Graham found the climate and environs to his liking, and he rapidly improved, regaining his health. He later related at the unveiling of the Bell Telephone Memorial:

I came to Brantford in 1870 to die; I was given six months lease of life, but I am glad to be alive today... As I look back upon it, visions come to me of the Grand River and of Tutela Heights and my dreaming place upon the heights where visions of the telephone came to my mind.

Alexander Graham frequented his "dreaming place", lying on a roll of carpet with a pillow and his books. He would relax, think, and "... dream away the afternoon in luxurious idleness" while also contemplating the undulating ripples of the Grand River below him. The younger Bell continued his previous interest in the study of the human voice, and when he discovered the Six Nations Reserve across the river at Onondaga, he learned the Mohawk language and translated its unwritten vocabulary into Visible Speech symbols, a written scientific vocabulary invented by his father. For his work Alexander Graham earned the tribe's friendship and was awarded the title of Honorary Chief and participated in a ceremony where he donned a Mohawk headdress and performed traditional dances. Thereafter Bell would break into a Mohawk war dance if he became intensely excited.

After setting up his laboratory–workshop in the Homestead's carriage house, the younger Bell also continued his earlier electrical experiments based on misunderstood translations of Dr. Hermann von Helmholtz's work on electricity and sound as described in Die Lehre von den Tonempfindungen als physiologische Grundlage für die Theorie der Musik (The Sensations of Tone as a Physiological Basis for the Theory of Music). (Note: Prior to leaving the UK, Alexander Graham had fortuitously made a false deduction that would be the underpinning of all his future work on transmitting sound, reporting: "Without knowing much about the subject, it seemed to me that if vowel sounds could be produced by electrical means, so could consonants, so could articulate speech." He also later remarked: "I thought that Helmholtz had done it ... and that my failure was due only to my ignorance of electricity. It was a valuable blunder ... If I had been able to read German in those days [—the language Helmholtz's work was originally published in—], I might never have commenced my experiments!") He also modified a melodeon (a type of pump organ) so that it could transmit its music electrically over a distance. When the family was settled in and he had regained his health, both Alexander Graham and his father, an authority on the acoustics of speech, made plans to establish teaching practices. As the senior Bell was soon occupied with a lecture position at Queen's College in Kingston, Ontario, he sent his son to Boston in his place when a contract was offered to teach in that city for the handsome sum of US$500 (approximately US$13,400 in current dollars). Over the next several years the younger Bell would live and work in the Boston area during the school year, and then return to his parents' homestead during the summer months to rest with his family and conduct further telegraphic, and later, telephonic research work.

During his summer vacation at the Homestead in 1874, Alexander Graham continued to contemplate electrical sound reproduction while viewing the undulating surface of the Grand River from his "dreaming place". He postulated that "it would be possible to transmit sounds of any sort" by the continuous variation of the intensity of the electric current. This method of sound energy to electrical signal transduction was fundamentally different from the on-or-off transmission methods used by other telephone experimenters. Alexander Graham held lengthy discussions with his father explaining what he thought he could achieve with a sound-driven transmitter producing an electrical signal which would instantaneously travel an electrical circuit to a receiver at another location where it would be converted back to sound. His record of a discussion with his father in their home's living room, wrote "If I could vary the intensity of the electric current in exact proportion to the variation of the air density in the production of words, I would be able to transmit speech by telegraph" (using the telephone's technical analog, the telegraph, as the former name had not yet been adapted). On 26 July 1874 in their living room the younger Bell realized the technical principles of telephony, inventing the telecommunications device he is now closely identified with. (Note: Over the course of his life Bell stated several times he had invented the telephone at the Homestead in July 1874. At a speech to the Canadian Club in Ottawa, 27 March 1909, he spoke before a large audience of important guests saying It is a rather curious thing to me to see the dispute about where the telephone was invented. I have not any doubt about it. It was I who invented the telephone, and it was invented wherever I happened to be at the time. It so happened that I resided in Salem, Mass., and carried on work in Boston, and then I would come up to my father's home in Canada to spend a large portion of my time. I carried my instruments with me, but of this you may be sure, the telephone was invented in Canada. It was made in the United States. The first transmission of a human voice over a telegraph wire, where the speaker and listener were miles apart was in Canada. But the transmission was only one way — you could not talk back; you had to telegraph back. The first transmission by wire in which conversation was carried on reciprocally over the same line was in the United States, but I was there all the time, and it certainly is the case that the telephone was invented in Canada and the first actual use of telephone lines was in this country. He also later stated "Brantford has an indisputable claim to this distinction and is rightfully named 'The Telephone City'." Bell's timeline, works and statements have been extensively documented and reviewed by many. A plaque specifically referring to his invention of the telephone; with the wording: "... .to mark the invention of the telephone at Brantford by Alexander Graham Bell in 1874" was mounted on the side of the Bell Telephone Memorial.) Returning again to the Homestead the next summer in 1875 Bell wrote his first draft specifications of the telephone patent—commonly considered to be the most valuable patent in history—that September. He later built his first fully functional unit at Boston on March 10, 1876. Later that year, in August, Bell made the first successful voice transmission of any notable distance, between Brantford and Paris Ontario.

On July 26, 1974, the Post Office Department released a commemorative postage stamp honouring the centennial of the invention of the telephone stating "At Brantford... Alexander Graham Bell, a young teacher of the deaf, spent a few weeks of leisurely contemplation and invented the telephone." The stamp depicts three telephones of various time periods, including his famous Gallows model, considered the world's first telephone. In 1915 Alexander Graham referred to it saying "The instrument, just as you see it here, was invented in the summer of 1874, during a visit I paid to my father and mother in Brantford ..." As well, one of the first successful voice transmission of any notable distance (6 km) was made on 4 August 1876, between the telegraph office in Brantford, Ontario and Melville House over makeshift wires.

=== Three great tests of the telephone ===
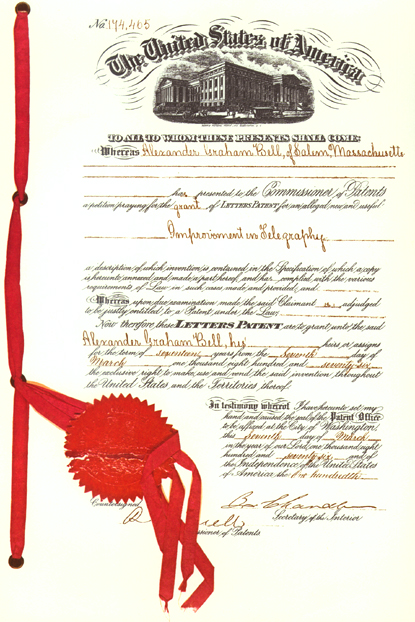
The master telephone patent, 174465, granted 7 March 1876

Only a few months after receiving U.S. Patent No. 174465 at the beginning of March 1876, Bell conducted three important tests of his new telephone invention and technology after he returned to his parents at Melville House for the summer. The third and most important test was the world's first true long-distance call, placed between Brantford and Paris, Ontario, on 10 August 1876. For that long-distance call Alexander Graham Bell set up a telephone using telegraph lines at Robert White's Boot and Shoe Store at 90 Grand River Street North in Paris via its Dominion Telegraph Co. office on Colborne Street. (Note: Another source spells the store's name differently, as Robert Whyte's Boot and Shoe Store.) The normal telegraph line between Paris and Brantford was not quite 13 km (8 miles) length, but the connection was extended a further 93 km (58 miles) to Toronto to allow the use of a battery in its telegraph office.

When the line connections were completed Graham Bell heard "... explosive sounds, like the discharge of artillery.... mixed with a continuous crackling noise of an indescribable character". Bell began to troubleshoot his device and after changing his telephone receiver's electromagnet from low to high resistance, voices suddenly emerged from the receiver "clearly and strongly", on a telegraph line connection of some 106 km (66 miles) length. Speaking to his son in Paris from Brantford's Dominion Telegraph office, Professor Alexander Melville Bell sang songs, quoted Shakespeare and read poetry. In Paris, news of Bell's test quickly drew crowds of onlookers who witnessed Melville's voice emanating from the crude metal box. With only a telephone receiver, Alexander Graham Bell could not respond directly to his father, and instead replied back by telegraph on a separate line to Brantford. Nevertheless Alexander Graham much later declared that this was the first one-way long-distance call "of several miles", but noted it was "the first transmission at a distance, but it was not the first reciprocal (two-way) conversation over a line. That was held in Boston on 9 October 1876.

Nonetheless, the third test in Southern Ontario was the world's first long-distance call, proving that the telephone was useful not only over short distances.

On a test call one week earlier on 3 August 1876, Alexander Graham's uncle, Professor David Charles Bell, (Note: Professor David Charles Bell (b. Fifeshire, St. Andrews, Scotland, 4 May 1817 – d. 28 October 1902, Washington, D.C.), married to Ellen Adine Highland, was Melville's elder brother by two years. He later followed Melville to Canada, emigrating from Ireland to Brantford along with his wife and several of his eleven children, including Aileen Lilly (1850-1914), Laura (b. 1852, m. James Kerr) and Charles James (b. 1858). His family's vocations and activities were highly similar to Melville's, its member's being gifted in music and elocution. David was also a professor of elocution and lectured on proper speech, writing several works on those subjects and in 1878 co-authored Bell's Standard Elocutionist: Principles and Exercises along with his younger brother Melville. David Bell had previously taught at Trinity College Dublin as Professor of English Literature and Elocution, where one of his students was the playwright George Bernard Shaw, whom he later introduced to Melville. Shaw, under Melville's influence was inspired to write the play Pygmalion (which spawned the musical production and movie My Fair Lady and refers directly to "Bell's Visible Speech"), and also became a life-long advocate of phonetic transcription —leaving a large part of his estate to the development of a "fonetic alfabet". Professor Bell died in Washington, D.C., age 86, and was survived by his three sons and four daughters. David's son Charles James Bell (Dublin, 12 April 1858 – 1 October 1929) would marry Roberta Wolcott Hubbard (4 June 1859 – 4 July 1885), and then Grace Blatchford Hubbard (9 October 1861 – 16 July 1948), sisters of Mabel Hubbard (Alexander Graham Bell's wife), and become President of the American Security and Trust Company in the Washington, D.C. area. He also later helped create the Graphophone Company of Alexandria, Virginia in 1886, a forerunner of Columbia Records.) spoke to him from the Brantford telegraph office, reciting lines from Shakespeare's Hamlet ("To be or not to be...."). The young inventor, positioned at the A. Wallis Ellis store in the neighbouring community of Mount Pleasant, listened to his uncle's voice emanating from his receiver housed in a metal box. Initially David Bell's voice couldn't be heard distinctly as "... all kinds and sizes of wire were used in stringing from the house to Mount Pleasant road". However, Walter Griffin, the Dominion Telegraph manager, decided to attach the telegraph line to a battery to see if it would improve the transmission, which it did, and "the voices then came in distinctly." (Note: Alexander Graham may also have transferred his uncle's voice onto a phonautogram, a drawing made on a pen-like recording device that could produce the shapes of sound waves as waveforms onto smoked glass or other media by tracing their vibrations. A phonautogram exists of the phrase "To Be Or Not To Be", published in a book coauthored by Melville Bell, Pioneering The Telephone In Canada, but was referred to as an 'oscilligraph' [sic]. The phonautogram's source is not specified and it may have been subsequently produced elsewhere.) That first Brantford call was followed the next day on 4 August during another call between Brantford's telegraph office and Melville House when a large dinner party, including members of the Cowherd family who would later manufacture phones for Bell in Canada's first telephone factory, provided "... .speech, recitations, songs and instrumental music" that were transmitted to the Bell Homestead. To bring telephone signals to Melville House, Alexander Graham audaciously "bought up" and "cleaned up" the complete supply of stovepipe wire within Brantford. With the help of two of Melville's neighbours, E. McIntyre and Thomas Brooks, he tacked the stovepipe wire some 800 metres (a half mile) along the top of fence posts from his parents’ home to a junction point on the Mount Pleasant telegraph line, which joined that community to the Dominion Telegraph office in Brantford. (Note: Alexander Graham Bell's "first telephone line" was delayed until the afternoon of the day he started its installation at the request of Thomas Brooks so that he could "get out all his grain" being harvested in his fields (before the telephone line would block the laneway). In the afternoon Brooks joined Alexander Graham and another neighbour, E. McIntyre in stringing up the telephone line made from stovepipe wire. The Bells called this "Canada's first telephone line".)

Scientific American noted the test calls in their 9 September 1876 article, The Human Voice Transmitted by Telegraph. Historian Thomas Costain referred to them as "the three great tests of the telephone". One journalist wrote of them, "No one involved in these early calls could possibly have understood the future impact of these communication firsts".

=== Melville House ===
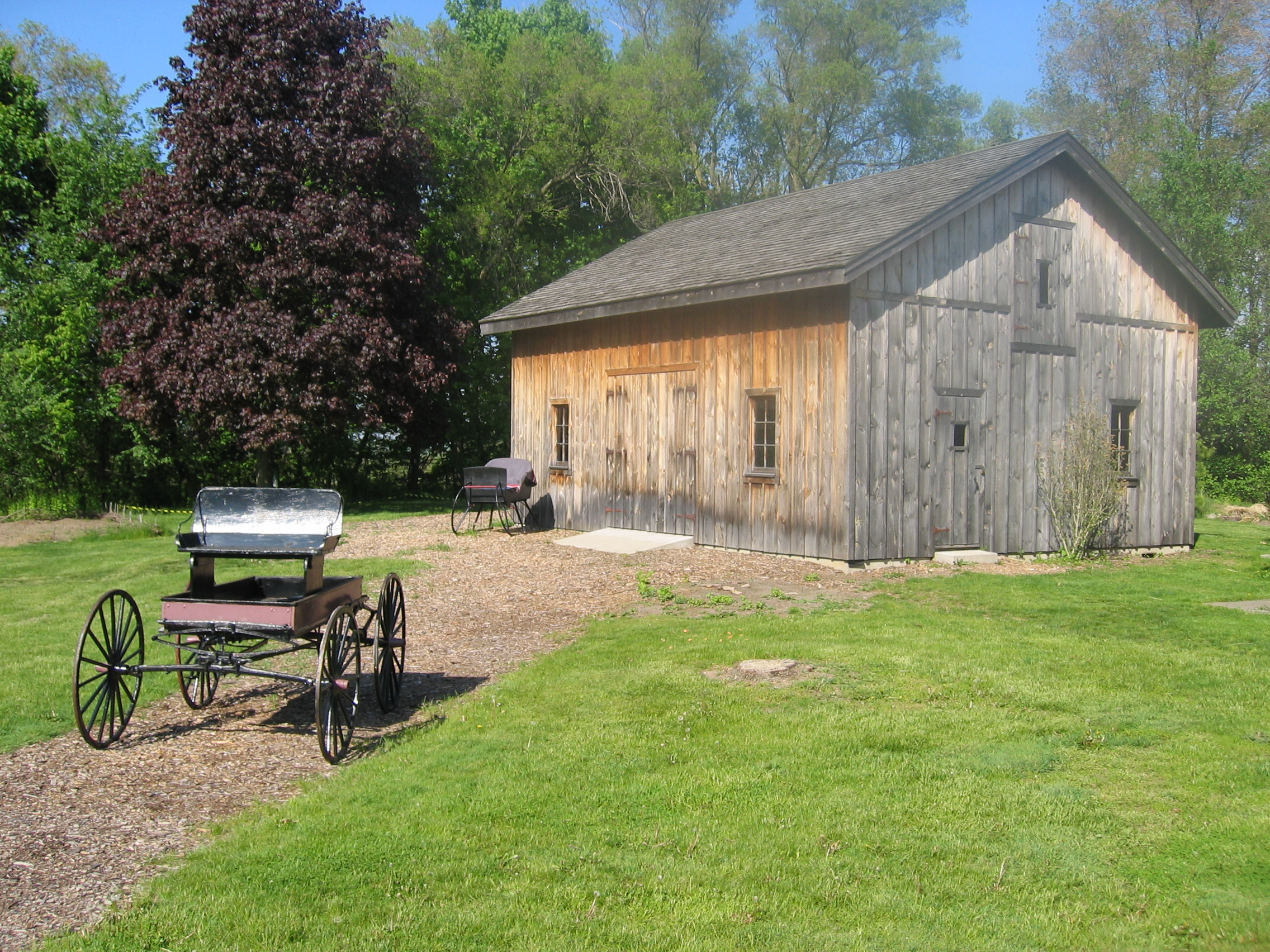
The carriage house used by Alexander Graham Bell in his early experiments (2012).

Melville House was the name given to his home by the elder Bell, and which was used on the letterhead of his stationery, reading in full: "Melville House, Tutelo Hights". The large 10-room, two story wooden neoclassical Italianate villa style farmhouse was originally built in 1858 for Robert Morton, a retired Montreal building contractor who moved to the area to be close to his two sons Andrew and Y.J., owners of the Morton Hardware Store in Brantford. The elder Morton had purchased several hundred acres of land along the Grand River one year earlier from Margaret and Elizabeth Stewart at a cost of £183 (equivalent to approximately C$25,800 in 2012).

The farmhouse was constructed amid towering elm trees, from hand-hewn lumber on a fieldstone foundation and finished with masonry stucco and lath work. Its architectural features included pine and wood pegged floors, walnut window trims, a main floor ceiling over three metres (10 feet) in height, a low-pitched gabled roof, a gingerbread trim-styled front veranda as well as a bathtub and shower equipped washroom fitted to an attic or ceiling level rainfall cistern —installed by the younger Bell at a time when few homes in the region had any fixed bathtubs at all. Its shower and oversized bathtub (likely chosen for the younger Alexander's large frame) drew hot and cold water from piping leading to both a ceiling level cistern and to a hot water heater in the basement. The home's layout featured a central hallway plan and its ten rooms included a large kitchen, large dining room, parlour, study plus four bedrooms on its upper floor. A greenhouse conservatory with a workroom at its rear were also added by the Bells to the side of the house, off of its parlour. They were later removed in the 1920s, and then rebuilt in the early 1970s along with the house's verandah and chimneys.

The property, which borders the Grand River, originally contained an approximate 4-hectare (10.5 acres) fruit orchard, large farmhouse, stable, pigsty, henhouse, icehouse and a carriage house. (Note: The present complex, dating from 1858, is located at 94 Tutela Heights Road, Brantford, and is now known as the "Bell Homestead", formally the "Bell Homestead National Historic Site". It received its historical site designation from the Government of Canada on June 1, 1996. The homestead site was originally 51/4 hectares in size when purchased by the Bell family, but was later reduced to about 4 hectares. Erosion of the heights above the side of the Grand River, believed to be up to 45% of the property's original size, has significantly reduced its overall size since it was first entered into the Province's land registry prior to the arrival of the Bell family. In the early 1920s the City of Brantford attempted to stabilize the bluffs with pilings to prevent further erosion, but was unsuccessful.) During the Bells' 11-year residence at the Homestead, the working farm, with its plum, cherry, pear, apple and peach orchards, supplemented Melville's modest income from dramatic readings at elocutionary performances and university lectures on elocution and vocal physiology. Moreover, college lecture assignments were scarce for the male Bells as the nearest university was in Toronto, some 105 km (65 miles) away. The Bell family was not well-to-do, but upper-middle class, and depended on the sales of their farm products to make ends meet. (Note: The farm was purchased for $2,600, but with only $2,100 paid at the time of sale. The Bell's may have paid the rest by taking a mortgage or loan. On 10 October 1870 Alexander Graham Bell wrote to his father Melville, then lecturing at Queen's College in Kingston, Ontario, that their family's finances through the coming winter appeared to total $37, consisting of $20 in their bank account and $7 cash on hand, with a further $10 expected from the sale of their farm orchard fruit.)

After Melville sold the homestead to Matthew Whiting in 1881 to join his son in Washington, D.C., the handsome farmhouse and property changed ownership five more times until it was acquired in 1909 by the Bell Telephone Memorial Association, which at the time was collecting funds to build a major memorial to both Alexander Graham and to the invention of the telephone, the Bell Telephone Memorial. In 1910 Melville House became a museum dedicated to the Bell family, including both Melville and Alexander, and to Alexander Graham's invention of the telephone there in July 1874. The Homestead was deeded by the Association to the City of Brantford in 1917, with restoration of the home to its earlier condition taking several decades. In 1925 it was moved 80 feet (24 m) closer to Tutela Heights Road onto a new foundation further from the Grand River due to the continuing erosion of the tall river bank adjacent to the farmhouse. This was done only after the City of Brantford had attempted to stabilize the bluffs with pilings to prevent further erosion in the early 1920s—attempts which were unsuccessful.

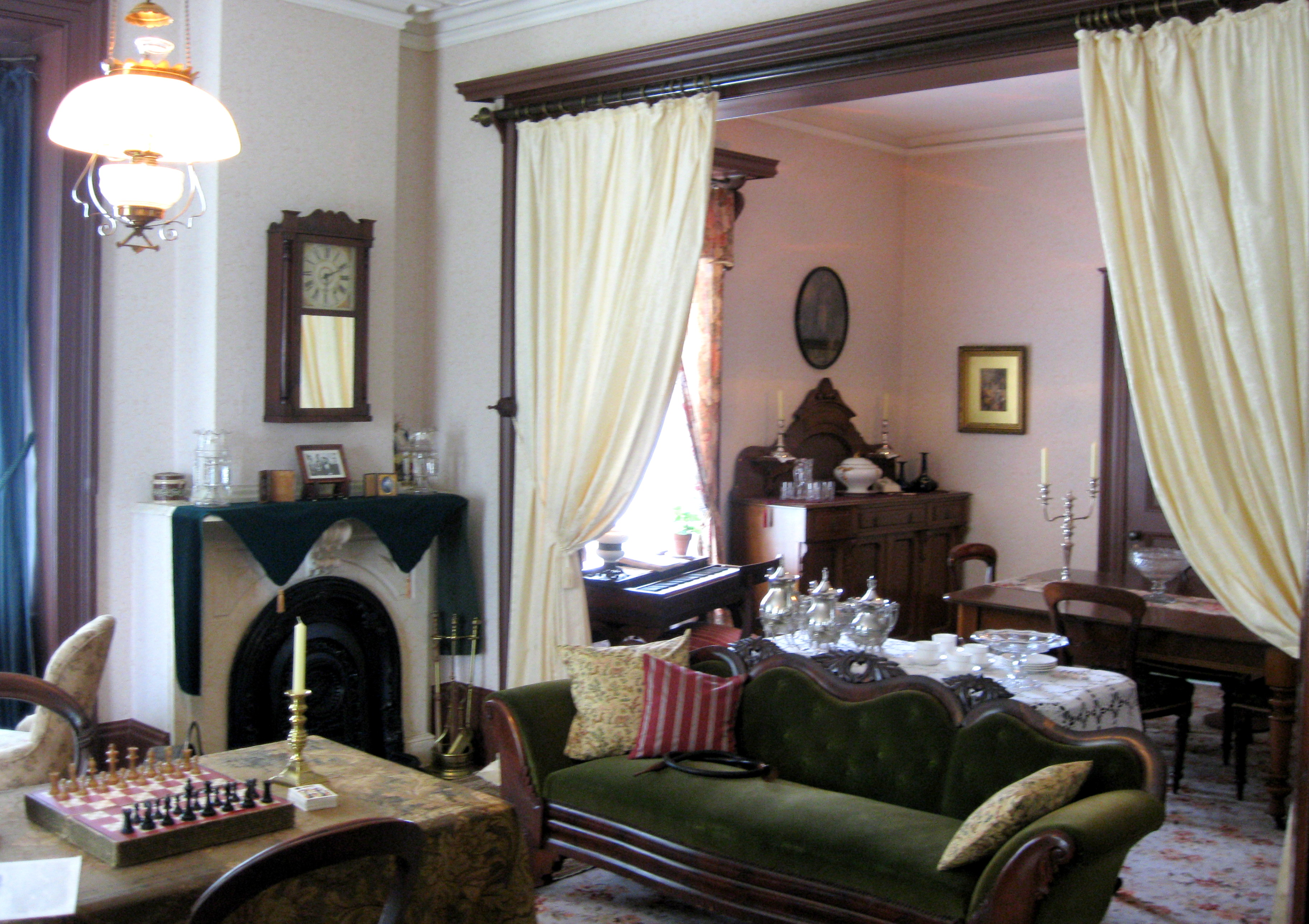
A portion of Melville House's parlour, restored to the Victorian era style maintained by the Bells, using many of their original furnishings and artifacts, including their melodeon, seen in front of the window at centre (2009).

The Bell Homestead Museum first opened to the public in October 1910 with two rooms available for viewing, and over several decades repurchased or received donations of much of the Bell family's original home furnishings, including its cabinetry, furniture and piano-like melodeon, eventually comprising 90% of their Melville House furnishings. Further donations from Bell family descendants also included books, china, paintings, a silver tea service that was a wedding gift to Alexander Graham and his bride Mabel Bell, a gold candy dish that was a wedding present to the elder Bells, Melville's walnut shaving stand and Mabel's favourite wing chair. One important donated item is the original melodeon (serial number 16265 of the George A. Prince Company) given to the Homestead museum by the granddaughter of Jenny Cowherd (who later became Mrs. Joseph Durnan). Jenny's father was Thomas Cowherd, whose hardware store supplied stovepipe wire to Graham Bell, and her brother was James, who built almost 2,400 telephones for Melville's telephone company and for the Bell Telephone Company of Canada. Jenny also played the melodeon and sang for at least one of Alexander Graham's telephone demonstrations.

Many of the items had originally been sold at auction in 1881 by Melville's family when he and his wife moved to join their son Alexander Graham in Washington, D.C., much later being donated back to the Melville House Museum. (Note: For some years prior to Alexander Melville Bell selling the homestead, Alexander Graham would spend summers residing with his parents. However after sales of the younger Alexander's invention, the telephone, began to accelerate, the Bell Telephone Company (later AT&T) was beset with multiple legal actions involving would-be competitors and imitators (see The Telephone Cases). One formidable direct competitor that ignored the Bell patent and attacked their market headlong was Western Union, at the time one of the world's largest and most powerful companies. The Bell Telephone Company's first president (and Alexander Graham Bell's father-in-law), Gardiner Green Hubbard, assigned the younger Bell to testify at the various court trials in Washington, D.C. Alexander Graham was both an employee of and an approximate one third shareholder of the new company, the Bell Telephone Company, named after him; however Bell eschewed active involvement in its business affairs, which was managed by its two other principals. Both father and son also joined many of the scientific and educational institutions in Washington, D.C. (additionally helping create National Geographic and stabilizing the journal Science) making the move to the U.S. capitol a permanent one. However Alexander Graham soon also built a much larger home and estate, complete with a large laboratory building, at Beinn Bhreagh, Nova Scotia, where the Bells resided increasingly for over 35 years, and where both the younger Alexander and his wife would later be interred.) A third room, to the left of the front entrance on the ground floor, was not furnished and opened to the public until 1947.

The Homestead and Melville House museum have developed special programs through the years, such as their Christmas holiday celebrations when the farmhouse is "... decorated in the style and traditions of Alexander Graham Bell's American wife Mabel, with stockings stuffed full of oranges and toy trinkets." Costumed interpreters and slide presentations also provide the public with a more personal and comprehensive experience. They have additionally earned plaudits for their dedication to authenticity, with one reviewer writing:

Although the house is kept as a historic site, it has a comfortable look of habitation about it. Freshly pressed, embroidered linens hang on the side of the bathtub, a basket of needlework waits to be completed and clothes hang in the bedrooms.

Amidst all these homey little touches, are some of the Bell family's possessions, which serve as a clue to the kind of clever, inventive mind that thrived in these surroundings. In the parlor hangs a trompe-l'œil print of Saint Cecilia that looks as if it has been framed behind broken glass....

Just as bizarre is the stuffed duck-billed platypus which sits in the study among the books and telephone wires. It was brought from Australia in 1874 by visiting relatives who must have thought it just the right sort of offbeat souvenir for the Bells.

Overall, the journalist noted:

A pretty white home surrounded by shade trees and flower beds may not be the popular idea of the kind of place where a creative genius lives, especially someone who advised people to "leave the beaten track occasionally and dive into the woods." Yet Alexander Graham Bell's Homestead in Brantford presents a dignified picture of middle class bliss.

Melville House and the Homestead, visited by over a million people from numerous countries around the world, has been described as "... this shrine, where lingers the spirit of the great inventor". At a farewell dinner at Brantford's Kerby House as Melville was preparing to depart for Washington, D.C., the elder Bell addressed the invited banquet guests, saying "[Our son] could not come to us, so we resolved to go to him. I now confidently feel that my sojourn in Brantford will outlive my existence because under yon roof of mine the telephone was born".

=== Henderson Home ===
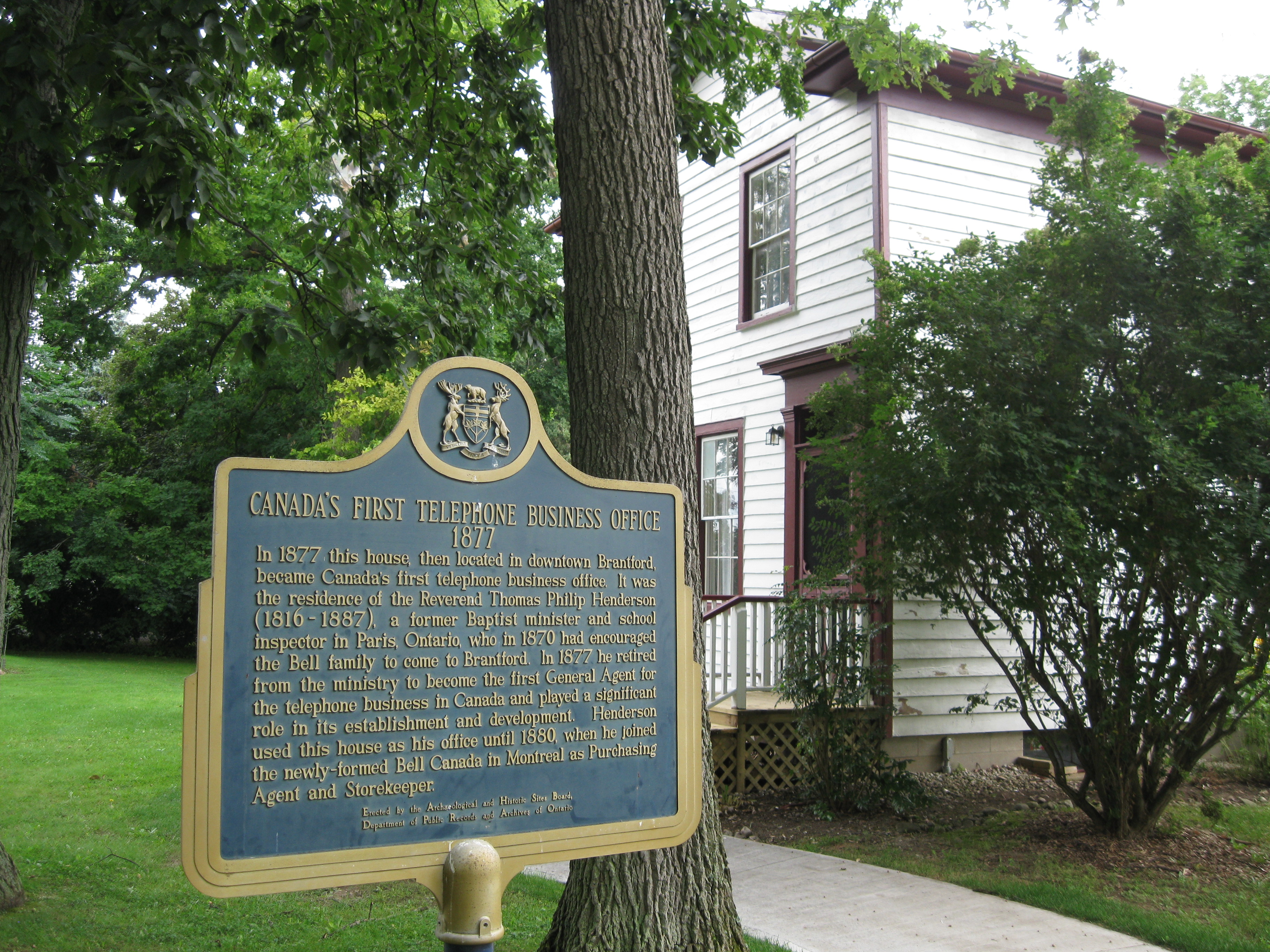
A historical plaque to the side of the Henderson Home, commemorating Canada's first telephone business office of 1877.

The two story white framed clapboard home of Reverend Thomas Philip Henderson (b. Scotland, 1816 – d. 1887), served as his combined residence and religious library as well as the business office of Canada's first telephone company. In 1969 the house was carefully raised onto a flatbed mover and relocated from Brantford's downtown area (at 30, formerly 46 Sheridan Street, approximately three city blocks from the Bell Telephone Memorial), to the Homestead site where it was renovated to serve as a telephone company museum. The house had been donated in October 1968 by its then-owner, William C. Burles (born in Bath, England, 1885, eighteen years after Alexander Graham taught there at its Somersetshire College), and it is now known at the Homestead as the Henderson Home.

The house, likely built in 1843, had been Burles' family home for some 44 years. At the time of its donation he was living there as a widower along with his daughter, his wife having died the previous December. The four bedroom structure had previously been the home and office of Reverend Thomas Henderson (1817-1887), the close friend, advisor and associate of Melville Bell and his son Alexander Graham. Henderson had persuaded Melville and his family to immigrate to Canada in 1870 to prevent the death of his last son Alexander Graham, who was being consumed by disease. Melville Bell appointed Henderson as his phone company's general agent "for the Dominion of Canada" after Melville received 75% of the phone's Canadian patent rights from his son in 1877. Henderson faithfully served Melville's company from 1877 until 1880, when he became an employee of the Bell Telephone Company of Canada (later Bell Canada) at their Montreal headquarters. Henderson served Bell in Montreal until his death in 1888. (Note: Alexander Graham Bell astutely assigned the other 25% of his phone's Canadian patent rights to Boston telephone manufacturer Charles Williams Jr. in exchange for 1,000 telephones to be produced for Canada; however Williams failed to complete the order in a timely fashion, compelling Bell to begin manufacturing telephones (produced at James Cowherd's factory) for the Canadian market in Brantford.) Henderson also supervised the telephone manufacturing being conducted at the Brantford telephone factory run by Bell's friend James Cowherd, son of the Brantford's hardware store owner Thomas C. Cowherd who had supplied the Alexander Graham with almost all of the stovepipe wire available, used for his Bell's first telephone line.

Cowherd's Brantford factory's first shipment of nineteen telephones was made to Hugh Cossart Baker in Hamilton, Ontario on 23 December of that year, with total production of all orders eventually reaching 2,398 phones before James was stricken with tuberculosis and died. Henderson later moved to Montreal to join the Bell Telephone Company of Canada where he became their purchasing agent and storekeeper until his death in 1887. In September 1877 the Bells' installed a 51/4 km (31/4 mile) telephone line from their homestead to connect to Reverend Henderson's house in downtown Brantford where the city's telephone exchange was installed. A telephone line was also installed to the city's telegraph office.

On 9 August 1970, Ontario Lieutenant Governor William Ross Macdonald, aided by the home's former owner William Burles, officially opened the Henderson House before an invited assembly of distinguished guests and notables, including Brantford Mayor Richard Beckett, Robert W. Gray of the Maple Leaf Chapter of the Telephone Pioneers of America, Jack E. Skinner of the Bell Canada, Alderman Andrew Donaldson of the Bell Homestead Committee, Don J. Southcott of Northern Electric, Bell Telephone of Canada historian Robert Spencer, and Boston University Professor Robert V. Bruce, who was some two years away from the release of his definitive biography on the younger Bell (titled as Bell: Alexander Graham Bell and The Conquest of Solitude). Bell Historian Robert Spencer provided the assembly with a detailed description of the three phases of restoration that was then underway at the Homestead.

After the Henderson Home was transferred to its new Homestead location in 1969 it was then renovated and converted to a telephone museum, with exhibits of early telephone and switchboard technology stretching back to the 1880s. The museum's exhibits were developed in cooperation with Bell Canada, the Canadian successor to the phone company established by Melville with Reverend Henderson's assistance, after Alexander Graham gave his father 75% of the Canadian patent rights to the invention. The exhibits included a model of the nation's first telephone factory, a three-story building established by some of Bell's friends in Brantford, Thomas Cowherd and his son James. Other artifacts included telephone components, an original 'telephone exchange' or switchboard, and early model telephones leading up to the Contempra telephone produced by Bell Canada's affiliate equipment manufacturer, Nortel. In 1973 Bell Canada also later offered an "extensive and valuable" collection of telephone and telecommunications equipment on permanent loan for display in the museum.

Renovations planned in the early 1970s time included the conversion of its ground floor into a telephone museum and its upper floor rooms into a residence for the Homestead's caretakers, who were then residing on the upper level of Melville House, thus allowing the complete restoration of those rooms to their original condition as part of the Melville House museum.

In 1971 Ontario Minister James W. Snow, in front of Brantford Mayor Howard Winter, Alderman Andrew Donaldson, chairman of the Bell Homestead Committee, plus Bell Historian Robert H. Spencer and other dignitaries, commemorated the Henderson Home with a historical marker plaque standing freely in front of the building (see photo above). Snow stated to an assembly of more than a hundred "This simple frame structure, less than 100 years ago, was the cradle of the telephone business.... The plaque pays tribute to a giant among inventors".

Reverend Thomas Henderson was himself memorialized earlier in June 1954 at Perth, Ontario's Elmwood Cemetery by a large gathering of Telephone Pioneers of America members attending a three-day conference in the city where Henderson was interred after his death. Approximately 200 dignitaries, Pioneers and others attended a graveside memorial service where a plaque in his memory was unveiled, in a service also attended by Henderson's great-granddaughter.

== Renovations, restorations and expansion ==
The Homestead complex and Melville House have been renovated and restored several times: first in the early 20th century, then in the early 1970s (in three phases in preparation for the centennial of the telephone's invention) as well as in 1994, and finally in the late 1990s to revert changes made at the Homestead by its subsequent owners after Alexander Graham's parents departed in 1881. Later restorations were also meant to provide the home with a more authentic and less museum-like experience.

The Bell Telephone Company of Canada (renamed to Bell Canada in 1968), which had provided financial and other support to the Homestead since 1921, assigned its own historian to head the Homestead's restoration committee in 1969. Bell Canada additionally built a caretaker's house on the site and helped finance other renovations and commemorative projects. Other improvements included a return to the home's original cream and green exterior paint scheme, as existed when the Bells lived there.

Phase I and Phase II renovations of the early 1970s included the transfer of the Henderson Home from downtown Brantford to its new foundation at the homestead and its conversion into a museum, plus the restoration of Melville House's ground floor, and the rebuilding of the greenhouse conservatory that had been removed during the 1920s (likely when the farmhouse was moved 25 metres away from the eroding bluffs overlooking the Grand River). The house's verandah and chimneys were also rebuilt at that time. Phase III of the campaign was meant to also transfer the caretaker's residence from the upper level of Melville House to the upper level of the Henderson Home to allow for the complete restoration of the farmhouse to its original condition when the Bells resided there. However an extra $60,000 of funding became available for the construction of a new caretaker's cottage, described as "a typical little Ontario house with two bedrooms", as well as new public washroom facilities. The Homestead's curator, Mr. C. E. Studier, and his wife were at the time residing on the upper level of Melville House. Plans were also being drawn up then to renovate the coach house which was then providing the food and drink concessions area for visitors. Also under consideration was a possible larger telecommunications museum of a national stature. Considerable efforts were made to have the phased renovations completed in time for the 1974 centennial year celebrations of the telephone's invention, during which visitor admissions to the Homestead totaled some 100,000 people.

Restoration and new facilities work progressed across the Homestead through the years. In 2005 its carriage house was dismantled and the rebuilt in 2007 at a cost of $75,000. The mid-1980s saw the expansion of the Homestead's general facilities, including a new visitor's reception centre and mini-theatre added for slide and movie presentations.

In 1998 the Homestead museum's curator, Brian Wood, viewed hundreds of letters written by the Bells at the Alexander Graham Bell Museum archive in Baddeck, Nova Scotia, and used those writings to determine the true layout of the Homestead and its farmhouse rooms during the family's tenure. The Bell Homestead eventually acquired many of the Bell letters between Alexander Graham and his mother, enabling the museum to accurately recreate the Homestead as it existed during the period of Melville's ownership. (Note: Many of the Bell letters were serialized for publication in the Brantford Expositor during 2001 and 2002. In 2010 some of the Bell letters were also published in book form as My Dear Aleck: Selected Letters of the Bell Family, 1867–1873.)

In 2002 the Homestead converted its former caretaker's cottage into a tea room cum café, launched on 2 July as the Bell Homestead Café at a cost of approximately $56,000 in order to serve hot meals and fresh baked goods to visitors, with its staff dressed in period-era costumes. Further renovations planned for the homestead in 2003 included work on its carriage house, pantry and scullery, as well as the development of a master plan for the entire complex.

== Commemorations ==
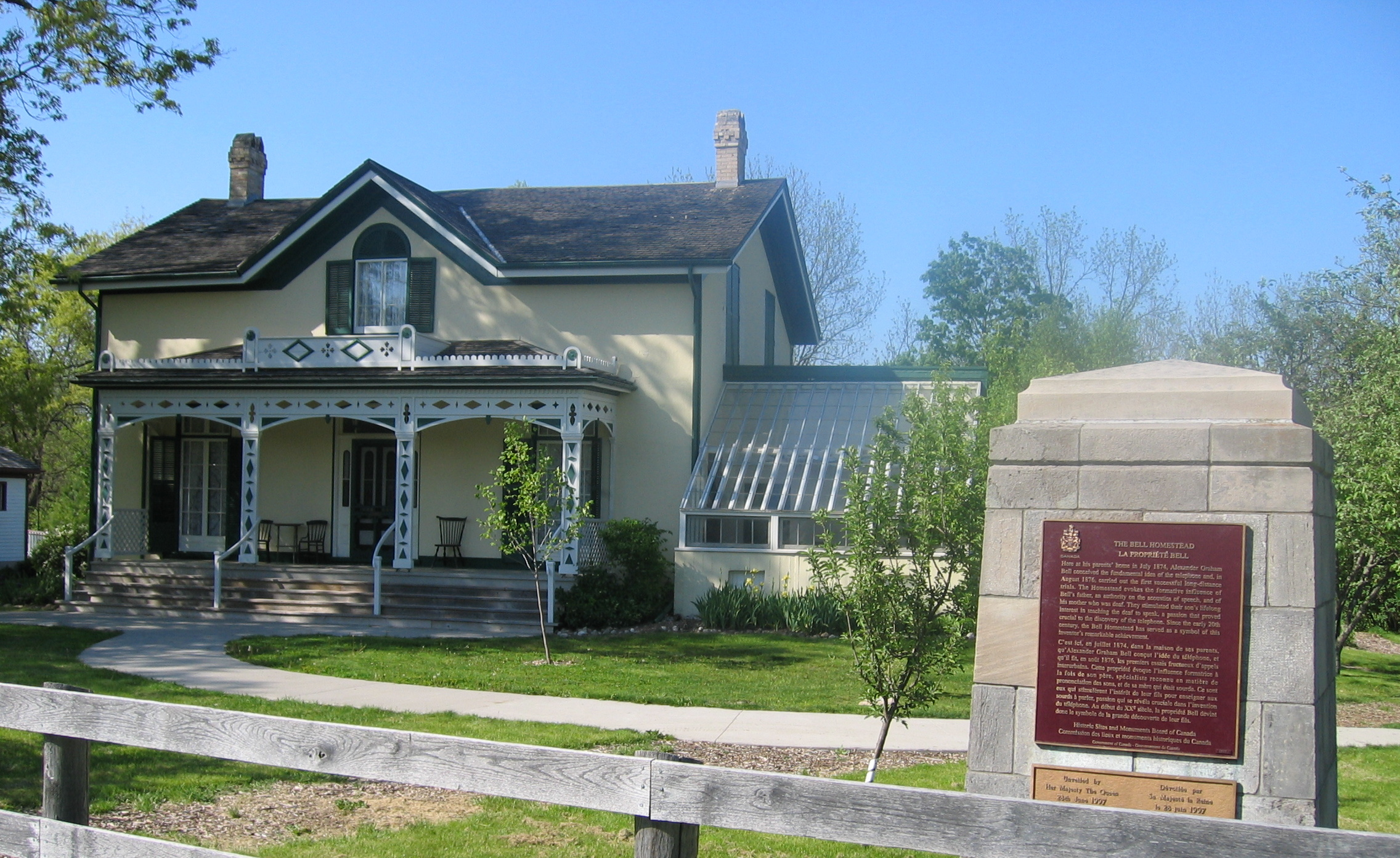
Federal plaque unveiled by Queen Elizabeth II in 1997, marking the Bell Homestead a National Historic Site

During an elaborate public ceremony before a crowd numbering in the thousands, the Homestead and the Bell Telephone Memorial were both formally presented to the City of Brantford on Wednesday, October 24, 1917, by Victor Cavendish, the Duke of Devonshire, then Governor General of Canada. A city-wide holiday was declared on that day in honour of the event.

Several commemorations have been held at the Homestead honouring the 1874 invention of the telephone at the site by their son, Alexander Graham Bell, the Bell family themselves, and other events related to the Bell System. In 1997 Queen Elizabeth II visited the Homestead and unveiled a commemorative plaque, reflecting its National Historic Site status.

=== Centennial of Bell's birth, 1947 ===
In 1947 the Homestead hosted a live radio broadcast, with Prime Minister William Lyon Mackenzie King addressing a dinner of invited guests. Speakers and guests included Alexander Graham's daughter, Mrs. David Fairchild and J.A.D. McCurdy of the Aerial Experiment Association, Transportation Minister Chevrier, Chancellor H.J. Cody of the University of Toronto and Dr. Jack Mackenzie, president of the National Research Council.

The Post Office Department issued a stamp to mark Bell's birth centennial on March 3, 1947—a four-cent commemorative, featuring Bell's portrait crowned by an allegorical figure, Fame, standing on a globe showing much of North America. Telephone lines appear in the background. Another stamp honouring Bell was issued on March 17, 2000, as part of Canada Post's millennium collection, showing Bell working, surrounded by images of projects he worked on at Cape Breton (the Silver Dart, a person-carrying kite, hydrofoil).

=== 75th year Bell Telephone Company commemoration, 1953 ===
In September 1953 ceremonies were held at the Bell Homestead in the 75th anniversary year of the Bell Telephone Company, formally incorporated in Massachusetts on July 30, 1878. A cut stone monument in the form of a memorial cairn was presented by Professor Fred Landon of London, Ontario, former Vice President of the University of Western Ontario and Chair of the Historic Sites and Monument Board of Canada. The cairn was transferred to the City of Brantford's Board of Park Management in front of Mayor Howard E. Winter, Brant County Warden Stanley Force, representatives of the Charles Fleetford Sise Chapter of the Telephone Pioneers of American and large numbers of the public. Alexander Graham Bell's granddaughters Lilian Grosvenor Coville of Washington, D.C. (who arrived directly from the Bell estate at Baddeck, Nova Scotia) and Nancy Bell Fairchild Bates of Ann Arbor, Michigan, unveiled the monument and bronze plaque.

Celebrations included a municipal holiday in Brantford designated as the "Bell Homestead Day" and an 80-member choir provided a musical program. In their public address to the 1,000 people who attended the unveiling, Bell's granddaughters described his family as all being highly accomplished pianists and singers. Many musical celebrations were held at the homestead during the family's residence, including a "musical orgy" lasting two to three days. The Bell's musicfests had included four-handed piano duets and recitations of Scottish ballads, combined with the acting of various scenes from Hamlet, Macbeth and Julius Caesar. Grosvenor Coville also spoke extensively of her grandfather's and great-grandfather's dedication to the education of the deaf (the younger Bell, with his father's financial assistance, founded the Volta Bureau in 1887, later renamed as the Alexander Graham Bell Association for the Deaf and Hard of Hearing) At the ceremony's conclusion Bates and Coville were presented with gold-plated miniature telephones by Brenda Winter, niece of Brantford Mayor Howard Winter, in appreciation for their assistance in the unveiling.

The cairn and commemoration events were the culmination of some 15 years of preparatory work. For unknown reasons the formal paperwork registering the site at the national Historic Sites and Monuments Board in Ottawa was not submitted at the time, an omission which was later discovered and completed in 1996.

=== Centennial of the first long-distance call, 1976 ===
On August 10, 1976, Bell Canada and the Bell System helped celebrate the centennial of the first long-distance call with a commemorative service broadcast live from the Homestead to Vancouver, British Columbia, via a Telesat communications satellite. A large satellite dish was set up on the lawn in front of Melville House for the purpose.

The event being celebrated was Alexander Graham Bell's "three great tests of the telephone", which culminated with the call he received on August 10, 1876, in Paris, from his father and others speaking to him from the Dominion Telegraph Office in Brantford. For that long-distance test the younger Bell set up a telephone using telegraph lines at Robert White's Boot and Shoe Store running through the Dominion Telegraph office in Paris. The normal telegraph line of about 13 km (8 miles) length between Paris and Brantford was extended a further 93 km (58 miles) to Toronto to allow the use of a battery in its telegraph office. A similar celebration organized by the Telephone Pioneers of America had been held earlier on the telephone call's 91st anniversary in August 1967, with the ceremonies being broadcast live from the site by a microwave transmitter.

=== 75th Homestead anniversary, 1985 ===
In June 1985 the Bell Homestead celebrated its 75th year since its doors opening in October 1910, attended by some 1,000 guests and visitors. Included was a new exhibit of telephone technology in the Henderson Home museum, hosted by Bell Canada and Northern Telecom. The celebration's entertainment featured Scottish highland dancers, a Gaelic choir, an actor portraying a young Alexander Graham Bell in period costume (who was compelled to remove his beard due to the very hot weather), and The Softshoers, a native dance ensemble from the Six Nations of the Grand River First Nation Reserve No. 5 School close by.

=== National Historic Site plaque unveiling, 1997 ===
On June 28, 1997, Queen Elizabeth II visited the Homestead and unveiled a commemorative plaque, reflecting its designation it as a National Historic Site. She was assisted by a Brantford native, the Honourable Jane Stewart, M.P., the federal Minister of Indian Affairs and Northern Development.

Some 2,000-3,000 visitors attended the ceremony, including Brantford Mayor Chris Friel, Six Nations First Nations Chief Wellington Staats, New Credit First Nations Chief Larry Sault, Bell Canada president John McLennan, members of Brantford's Royal Canadian Legion, plus several of Alexander Graham Bell's descendants, including his great-grandson, Hugh Bell Muller, plus Muller's new infant grandson Andrew Joseph Bell Muller. After signing the Homestead's official guestbook upon her arrival (as "Elizabeth R") she toured the Homestead, with its museum exhibits and displays being explained by students from the city's Graham Bell School. She was presented with a gift antique daffodil phone after being further greeted by Brantford native Ron Johnson, M.P.P., and then departed to meet Prime Minister Jean Chrétien at a reception with 1,000 invited guests. After the queen's departure, the president of the Royal Canadian Mint presented Alexander Graham Bell's youngest descendant, seven-week-old Andrew Joseph Bell Muller, with a $100 gold coin issued that year in tribute to the 150th anniversary of the birth of his famous ancestor.

The earlier laying of a commemorative cairn in 1953, unveiled by two of Bell's granddaughters, led to the impression that the site had been designated a National Historic Site—which was not the case, as the cairn was meant to commemorate the invention of the telephone as a National Historic Event. The lack of a historic site designation was uncovered in the early 1990s and approximately five years of paperwork was undertaken to receive its official status from Ottawa.

== Heritage designation ==
As stated by Parks Canada, the Homestead received its designation because:

- "it is associated with consequential events in Alexander Graham Bell's life, specifically the conception of and early long-distance trials of the telephone"
- "it illuminates the formative influence of Bell's parents, who stimulated his interest in working with the deaf - an interest that was fundamental to the development of the telephone"
- "it has also attained a symbolic importance as the Canadian site most widely associated with the telephone."ㅈㄴㅇ#ㅌㅊㅇㅊㅍㅊ ㅠ호촣흍ㅎ촟후홏ㅊ훛홒 ㅜㅎ촟훟촟훟춯추

Its character defining elements include:

- "its setting on a large rural lot overlooking the Grand River"
- "those elements which speak to its association with the Bell family, including the house with its vernacular British classical design, its centre-hall plan with a kitchen and an east wing, its stucco finish, its surviving original exterior and interior forms and materials, the carriage house with its original form and surviving materials, and the ㄹsurviving suburban lot typical of 19th-century domestic landscapes"ㅇㅅㄷㅌㅇㅎㅊ화ㅎㅇㄱㅎㅌ ㅠㅡㅍㅌㅌ

ㅇ포ㅡㅠㅗㅡㄹㅎㅎ* "... the relatively intact condition of thㅍe house ㅇㅎan d of theㅌ quiet, contemplative atmosphere of the property which has been 퐆maintained since the time of the Bell family occupation."ㄹㅍㄹㅍㅇㄹ츄ㄹㅠㅗㄹㅊㄹㅊㄹ춮ㅊ=ㅊㅎㅊㄹㅊㄹㅊㅍㅊㅎㅊㅎㅊㄹㅊㄹㅊㅊ훛훛훞ㅊ ㅠ The Province of Ontario designated it a Heritage Property under Part IV of the Ontario Heritage Act, and listed it within a Heritage Conservation District designated under Part V of the same act.

== Administration ==
The Homestead was originally purchased in 1909 by the Bell Telephone Memorial Association with funds collected principally to create the Bell Telephone Memorial. After the Homestead was deeded to the City of Brantford it was operated jointly by the Brantford Board of Park Management with the Telephone Pioneers of America's Charles Fleetford Sise Chapter covering Quebec and Ontario. The Homestead opened its doors to the public in 1910. It is currently listed as being located in Brantford's Plan No. 1482, Lot No. 75.

Today, the Homestead is under the administration of the City of Brantford's Parks and Recreation Department, with an average of about 45,000 people visiting the site annually through to the mid-1980s, although it received some 100,000 visitors during the Homestead's bicentennial year celebration in 1974.

== See also ==
- Alexander Graham Bell honors and tributes
- Alexander Graham Bell National Historic Site, Baddeck, Nova Scotia
- Alexander Graham Bell School, Chicago, Illinois
- Alexander Melville Bell
- Beinn Bhreagh, Nova Scotia, the Bell estate on the peninsula of the same name
- Bell Boatyard, Beinn Bhreagh, Nova Scotia
- Bell Telephone Memorial, also in Brantford, Ontario
- IEEE Alexander Graham Bell Medal
- Index of Alexander Graham Bell articles
- List of National Historic Sites of Canada in Ontario
- National Historic Sites of Canada
- Parks Canada
- Volta Laboratory and Bureau, Washington, D.C.
