= Thomas Cowherd =

Thomas C. Cowherd (March 20, 1817 – April 4, 1907) was a British-born tinsmith and poet, and father to 16 children in Brantford, Ontario, Canada, including James H. Cowherd, the second earliest manufacturer of telephones to Alexander Graham Bell.

== Early life and family ==
Cowherd was born in Kendal, Westmorland, England, to William Cowherd and Mary Cooper. When Thomas was two years of age, his mother Mary died. He apprenticed as a tinsmith from age 13 to 20 in England. His family immigrated to Canada in 1837. Cowherd eventually settled on Colborne Street in Brantford, Ontario.

He became President of the Brantford Branch Bible Society, President of the Brantford Mechanic's Institute and Literary Association, a school trustee, and was elected as a town councillor in 1869.

His first marriage, to Ann Batty (26 March 1818 – 9 March 1847), produced five children; she died in 1847 shortly after giving birth to the fifth of these, a daughter named Annie, who died later that year. Cowherd then married Ann's sister, Ellen Batty (14 January 1829 – 1926) of Westmoreland, Yorkshire, England, on 26 September 1847; they produced eleven more children. As Thomas Cowherd's career advanced he operated a tin and sheet iron shop plus a hardware store, opposite Brantford's grand Kerby House.

His children by Ann were Mary Ann (d. 1842), Thomas (b. 1840), William (1845–1893) and Anna (d. 1847). Ellen gave birth to Jennie (b. 1848), James H. (1849-1881) who married Mary Pickering, Christopher, who worked with James producing telephones, Alfred (b. 1853?), Amelia (b. 1854), Frederick (1857–1876), Ida (b. 1858), Charles William (1865–1931), Harold, Alice and Florence (m. 1869).

== Earliest telephone production ==
The Cowherd family were friends and associates of the scientist and telephone inventor Alexander Graham Bell. Bell used the Cowherds' tinsmithing services to help produce new prototypes for the telephone, and to open Canada's first telephone factory (possibly the world's first such plant). Bell also called on them to string telephone lines made from common stovepipe wire, and to assist in demonstrations. Thomas spent many hours speaking with Alexander on the telephone between the Cowherd home in Brantford and the Bell Homestead, Canada's first point-to-point telephone line which ran approximately 3 miles (5 km) between the two homes. The two were said to be "great chums".

Canada's first telephone factory was built by Thomas's son, James H. Cowherd (July 1849 – 27 February 1881). It was a three-story brick building on Wharfe Street in Brantford, Ontario (next to the early home of the Brantford Expositor), at the back of the Cowherd's home property, that soon started manufacturing telephones for the Bell System, eventually leading to the city's style as The Telephone City. (Note: Bell had originally asked Boston manufacturer Charles Williams to provide an initial order of 1,000 telephones for use in Canada in exchange for a 25% interest in the telephone's Canadian patent rights, but Williams' small shop was only able to produce a fraction of that number. Bell then spoke with a Brantford friend, James Cowherd (1849? – Feb. 1881), who set up Canada’s first telephone factory (and possibly the world's first such factory) which produced 2,398 telephones to Bell's specifications by 1881. Cowherd was sent by Bell to Boston in 1878 to study Williams manufacturing processes for a number of months, and then returned to Brantford to both produce and develop Bell's telephone models under the supervision of Alexander Melville Bell's associate Reverend Thomas Philip Henderson. The Brantford plant's first shipment of 19 telephones to Hamilton was made in December 23 of that year. Among Cowherd's designs was a transmitter fitted with a triple mouthpiece allowing three people to talk, and sing, simultaneously. James Cowherd's untimely early death due to tuberculosis was noted in major technical journals and led to the closure of the Bell Systems' manufacturing supplier in Brantford. Telephone production later resumed in Montreal, eventually leading to the creation of Northern Electric, later renamed Northern Telecom and then Nortel. A Brantford Expositor article later noted of the historic factory building's demise: "[Brantford] City officials and heritage committee members hung their heads in shame in 1992 when it was learned that a building that once housed the first telephone factory in the world had been approved for demolition. The embarrassing oversight came to light too late to stop wrecking crews, who were already tearing down the aged building at 32 Wharfe St... The building, where equipment for Alexander Graham Bell's first telephone was made, had even been pictured and written about in a city-printed brochure about the great inventor. A plaque erected by [the] Telephone Pioneers of America heralding the building's significance had been stripped from the structure in the mid-1980s and given to the Brant County Museum".)

== Poetry and writings ==
Thomas wrote verse "...with considerable merit", according to Thomas's son-in-law J.B. Parker, a journalist in Conway, Arkansas. He was a prolific poet and songwriter, and much of it appeared in newspapers (their home's property was adjacent to the Brantford Expositor). He ultimately published a collection in 1884 of over 300 pages of verse, "The Emigrant Mechanic and Other Tales Said In Verse Together With Numerous Songs Upon Canadian Subjects", which included 'An Address To Brantford, 1853':

As I have stood upon the pleasant hills

By which thou art encircled, I have cast
My eye from east to west, from north to south,
And often marked the vast extent of ground
Which thous mayst fill; laid out by God's own hand
To be glorious city, and that soon.
Then put thy shoulder to the wheel, arise
In all thy might, and let thy hardy sons
Put forth united effort in the work.
Deepen thy canal; let thy railroads make
Both quick and certain progress and neglect

No proper means to push the town ahead.

Other verses included 'To The Christians Of Brantford' (1853), advising the public on the perils of alcohol in a moralistic overtone, as well as verses of praise to the visiting Prince of Wales (1860):

Welcome, thrice welcome, to our fair town,

Albert Edward, the heir to Brittania's Crown!
We hail this your visit
With feelings exquisite,
And all party spirit most cheerfully drown
In the joy of the day;
While we earnestly pray

That God's richest blessings may compass your way.

== Later years ==
Correspondence between Thomas and Bell often contained conversations about Jesus Christ. Cowherd was himself a Methodist and was called "quite preachy".

Their son-in-law, J.B. Parker, described Thomas's home as "Just a typical English family, enjoying its own fireside and historical and magazine reading, with Thomas H. Cowherd inclined to poetical effusions and enjoying considerable prominence as a contributor to the press and later publishing a volume of his poems." The Bells were frequent visitors to their home, and Cowherd's wife was accomplished at producing home-brew from the family's mammoth vines. "...most of the brew went to invalids, for they gave much of their time and funds to looking after undernourished and aged people in temporary distress".

Thomas Cowherd died in Chatham, Ontario in 1907.

== See also ==
- Bell Telephone Memorial
