= Byron Edmund Walker =

Sir Byron Edmund Walker
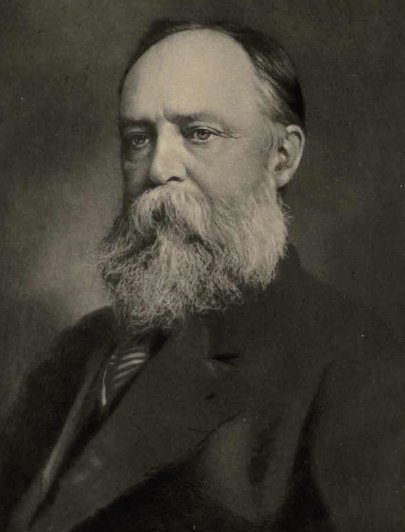

17th Chancellor of the University of Toronto
- In office 1923–1924
- President: Robert Falconer
- Preceded by: William Ralph Meredith
- Succeeded by: William Mulock

Personal details
- Born: 14 October 1848 Caledonia, Upper Canada
- Died: 27 March 1924 (aged 75) Toronto, Ontario, Canada
- Known for: Banker, philanthropist, patron of the arts

Sir Byron Edmund Walker, CVO (14 October 1848 – 27 March 1924) was a Canadian banker. He was the president of the Canadian Bank of Commerce from 1907 to 1924, and a generous patron of the arts, helping to found and nurture many of Canada's cultural and educational institutions, including the University of Toronto, National Gallery of Canada, the Champlain Society, Appleby College, Art Gallery of Ontario and Royal Ontario Museum.

In 1910, King George V knighted Walker for his contributions to business and the arts.

== Early years ==
Byron Edmund Walker was born on 14 October 1848 on the outskirts of Caledonia in Seneca Township, Haldimand County, Canada West.

His grandfather, Thomas Walker, had been a manufacturer of watchcases in London, England. He arrived in Upper Canada (now Ontario) in 1834 with four of his children, some books and some pictures. The loss of his wife and four of his children contributed heavily to his decision to leave London for Canada. The third youngest child was Alfred Edmund Walker, Sir Edmund's father, a farmer who became a clerk. He was also an amateur naturalist, paleontologist and watercolour painter. Alfred Edmund married Fanny Murton of Hamilton in 1845. Fanny's parents also were immigrants from England, having arrived in 1832. Her father, William Murton, was college educated and her mother spoke Italian and French and played the harpsichord. She also ran a private junior school in Hamilton.

The Walkers had nine children of which Byron Edmund (or Edmund, as he preferred to be called) was the second oldest. The family moved from their farm near Caledonia, to Hamilton in 1852. There, at the age of four, Edmund began studies at his grandmother's school and then at the Hamilton Central School where he completed all six grades. He hoped to pursue a teaching career but poor health curtailed his enrollment in the Toronto Normal School, the teacher's college founded by Egerton Ryerson in 1851. At the age of 12, Walker entered the service of his uncle, John Walter Murton, who had a currency exchange business in Hamilton.

== Banking career ==
While working at his uncle's bureau de change, Walker became an expert in recognizing counterfeit bills being circulated during the American Civil War. After seven years at his uncle's firm, he spent a few months in Montreal but poor health forced him to return to Hamilton in 1868 where he began work as a discount clerk in the newly opened Canadian Bank of Commerce.

The Canadian Bank of Commerce was established by industrialist William McMaster in 1867. McMaster would serve as a guiding light to the young Edmund, who quickly rose through the ranks. In 1872, he was appointed chief accountant at the bank's head office in Toronto. In May 1873, Walker was sent to New York City as junior agent for the bank. Charged with responsibility for loans of gold against currency, he successfully maintained proper margins in spite of his clients' many sudden bankruptcies. The enterprising Walker was then sent to the bank's Windsor branch in 1875. In 1878, he was appointed manager of the London, Ontario branch, a year later was made inspector of the bank, and in 1880 he returned to Hamilton as manager.

Walker married Mary Alexander in 1874 while living in New York. Together they had four sons and three daughters. She was the daughter of Alexander Alexander, a carpenter who emigrated from Scotland to Lockport, New York, in 1834. That year, he married Isabella Buchan and moved to Hamilton, Ontario, where he became a green grocer. Together they had five children.

From 1881 to 1886, Edmund was again in New York as the bank's joint agent, giving him the opportunity to increase his talents in foreign exchange and to conduct international banking on a much larger scale. There he could expand his cultural interests, visiting galleries and museums, and beginning, in earnest, his art collection. In 1886, at age 38, Walker was recalled to Toronto as general manager of the Canadian Bank of Commerce. By then there were 30 branches in Ontario and agencies in Toronto, Montreal and New York. The bank's assets at its inception were $2,997,081; 50 years later, these were $440,310,703 with branches across the country, largely attributable to Walker's strong leadership.

Walker is known for developing the first set of written regulations for dividing a bank into a complex array of departments and is widely credited for the Canadian government's 1881/82 revision of the Canada Banking Act that gave Canada a centralized, panic-proof banking system. Walker was also professionally respected internationally. As vice-president of the American Bankers Association he was invited by a U.S. congressional committee to advise on the drafting of the Federal Reserve legislation. He held many key national and international positions; chairman of the bankers' section of the Toronto Board of Trade from 1891 to 1892; vice-president of the Canadian Bankers Association (which he helped found in 1891) in 1893 and its president from 1894 to 1895; chairman of the 1899 Royal Commission on the financial position of the province of Ontario; and chairman of the Section of Money and Credit for the 1904 Universal Exposition in St. Louis. He was a fellow of the Institute of Bankers of England and fellow of the Royal Economic Society of England.

In 1906, he was elected director of the Canadian Bank of Commerce. He served as president from 1907 until his death in 1924.

== Political ties ==
The Liberal Party government of Sir Wilfrid Laurier appointed Walker to the National Battlefields Commission in 1908. The commission was charged with the recovery of non-Crown land for a "Battlefields Park" in Quebec City where the Battle of the Plains of Abraham was fought between French and British forces. The commission was also charged with supervision of the expenditures of the Tercentenary Celebration of Samuel de Champlain founding Quebec in 1608. Later, Walker was made chairman of the Canadian committee of the Peace Centenary, an event planned by the Canadian, American and British governments to commemorate 100 years of peace between Canada and the United States following the War of 1812-14.

Although Walker tried to stay out of active politics all his life and never joined a political party, he decided to take a pivotal role in the political arena with a group of 18 prominent businessmen who opposed the Reciprocity Agreement with the United States proposed by the Laurier government. Walker feared that the giant American trusts, once allowed into Canada, would paralyze the Canadian market. Furthermore, as an ardent patriot and staunch imperialist, he feared it would weaken Canada's ties with Britain and lead to annexation by the United States. The anti-reciprocity forces led to the defeat of Laurier's government in 1911. Walker was among those who advised the new Conservative Party prime minister, Sir Robert Borden, on preserving the financial stability of Canada during the First World War.

== Interests in education ==
Walker credited his father for developing his broad interests and love for learning, and always regretted that poor health prevented him from getting a formal education. He believed that the basis of a civilized society was its educational system and that a nation's universities were its most treasured institutions. Throughout his life he took an active interest in educational institutions. One of the first and most lasting of his interests was the University of Toronto. In 1887, the denominational institutions of Victoria College (Methodist), Knox College (Presbyterian), Wycliffe College (Anglican theological school), and St. Michael's College (Roman Catholic) had entered into a federation with the secular University College, the only one funded by the government. After fire destroyed the eastern portion of University College in 1890, Walker was instrumental in persuading the Ontario government to make its first grant to the amalgamated University of Toronto.

He was also responsible for leading the last denominational college - Trinity College, affiliated with the Church of England - into the federation in 1904. Trinity awarded him a Doctor of Civil Law (D.C.L.) that same year. In 1905, he was a member of the Royal Commission on the reorganization of the university, which was responsible for securing annual government grants thereafter. Over the course of his 32-year involvement with the university, Walker served as trustee (1892–1906), senator (1893–1901), member of the board of governors (1906–10), chairman (1910–23) and chancellor (1923–24).

The Toronto Conservatory of Music also joined the university through his efforts. He served as a member of its Board of Governors, and later as president (1917–24). His support for music also included the Mendelssohn Choir, for which he was honorary president (1900–24).

With a lasting commitment to education and the importance of Canadian history in nurturing patriotism and a Canadian identity, he founded the Champlain Society in 1905. Established as a non-profit organization, its mandate was to publish important documents relating to Canadian history, projects that commercial publishers would consider unprofitable. He believed that this Society was his finest achievement. He served as its president until his death.

As an author of articles on a variety of subjects - banking, Robert Browning, Italian and Japanese art - it is not surprising that Walker would be one of the founders of the Canadian Society of Authors, established to promote Canadian literature and protect authors with copyright laws. Walker served as president from 1904 to 1909.

In 1911, Walker established Appleby School, a boys' private boarding school, for which he purchased the initial 32-acre (130,000 m^{2}) property in Oakville. The first headmaster of the school was Walker's son-in-law John Guest.

== A love of art ==
Through his years in New York City and early trips to Europe - including to London in 1887 and Italy in 1892 - Walker developed skills as an art connoisseur and collector, often lecturing on the subject. His collection of art was housed in his Toronto residence - "Long Garth" at 99 St. George Street. The Victorian brick structure had fine wood interiors, Art Nouveau ceiling decorations by Gustav Hahn, and allegorical murals by George Agnew Reid. "Long Garth" became a treasure trove of etchings, prints, embroideries and oriental carpets, bronzes, brass and ivory work, porcelain china, not to mention his fossil collection and his extensive library. Walker had a particular fascination with printmaking and it was said that his expert eye for detail in detecting counterfeit banknotes aided his connoisseurship. Walker also was a member of the Japan Society of America and the most notable part of his collection, 1,070 Japanese woodblock prints, were bequeathed to the Royal Ontario Museum on his death. Equally of note is the collection of over 400 works of graphic art, ranging from the 15th to the 9th centuries, which he assembled between 1880 and 1924, including works by Albrecht Dürer and Rembrandt. His children gave the collection to the Art Gallery of Ontario in 1926.

Beyond purchasing some pictures by Canadian artists, Walker's first real connection with the Canadian art world began when he was approached by a number of prominent Toronto artists to help them organize a guild. With these like-minded laymen and artists who shared his ideals he formed the Toronto Guild of Civic Art. Spearheaded by George Agnew Reid, the guild pressed for civic improvements in the city. Walker served as its first president in 1897. As the Guild's representative on the committee to select the artist for the monument to Lieutenant Governor John Graves Simcoe at Queen's Park, Walker was largely responsible for the commission being awarded to sculptor Walter Seymour Allward. Later, Walker was responsible for Allward's commissions to design the South African War Memorial on University Avenue in Toronto, as well as the Bell Telephone Memorial in Brantford.

== The Art Gallery of Ontario ==
Walker's relationship with George Agnew Reid led to the founding of the Art Gallery of Ontario. On 15 March 1900, Reid, then president of the Ontario Society of Artists, brought a group of citizens together to consider the formation of an art gallery for Toronto. At that meeting, a Provisional Art Museum Board was set in place with Walker as chairman and Reid as secretary. Through effective lobbying and fundraising ($5,000 each from 10 benefactors), the Ontario Legislature later that year passed a bill incorporating the Art Museum of Toronto. Walker became president of its board of trustees and served until his death.

The initial challenge was to find a home for the new institution. It was Walker who convinced his friends, writer Dr. Goldwin Smith and his wife, the former Mrs. William Henry Boulton, to leave their historic house, "The Grange", to the new museum. Before the news became public, Walker bought surrounding land so that the museum would have space for future expansion. The Art Museum of Toronto (later renamed the Art Gallery of Toronto and then the Art Gallery of Ontario) officially opened its first galleries in The Grange in April 1913. In 1926, two years after his death, when the gallery was expanding, the Canadian Bank of Commerce donated the funds to build the magnificent room that bears his name, the Walker Court.

== The Royal Ontario Museum ==
The campaign for a world-class public museum for Toronto was led by Walker, philanthropist Sir Edmund Boyd Osler, then director of the Canadian Pacific Railway and president of The Dominion Bank, and Dr. Charles Trick Currelly, the first curator of the Royal Ontario Museum of Archaeology. An archaeologist, Currelly had been doing fieldwork in Egypt, Crete and Asia Minor for the purpose of collecting artifacts as a core collection for the small museum he established at Victoria College in 1907. But he wanted a larger museum for the university and others soon became involved. Walker, Osler and others provided funds and solicited financial support from the government.

Together, Osler and Walker created an organizational structure for the museum, including how funding was to be shared between the university and the government. In 1912, the Royal Ontario Museum Act was passed. A Board of Trustees was created, with appointments shared equally by university and government. Walker was its first chairman.

The Royal Ontario Museum opened on 19 March 1914. Currelly became director in 1914 until his retirement in 1946 and Walker remained chairman of the Board of Trustees until his death. In the ensuing years he contributed financially, and assisted through generous lines of credit from the Canadian Bank of Commerce, notably for Currelly's substantial acquisitions of Chinese artifacts. Walker's fossil collection became the nucleus of the museum's paleontology collection, and resulted in a dinosaur, Parasaurolophus walkeri, being named after him in 1922. His interest and support of paleontology had led to an earlier association with the Royal Canadian Institute, another scientific institution of which he was president from 1898 to 1900.

== The National Gallery of Canada ==
At the first official exhibition of the Royal Canadian Academy of Arts on 6 March 1880, Canada's Governor General, the Marquis of Lorne, established the National Gallery of Canada at the Clarendon Hotel in Ottawa. An Advisory Arts Council was formed in 1907 and consisted of Sir George Drummond, president of the Bank of Montreal, as chairman; the senator from Montreal, Arthur Boyer, as secretary; and Sir Edmund Walker, then just newly appointed president of the Canadian Bank of Commerce, as member. The council was charged with advising the government on architecture and decoration of public buildings and public monuments. It was responsible for selecting and purchasing artworks for the collection. Drummond favoured the acquisition of European works while Walker was adamant that Canadian art be included. On Drummond's death in 1909, Walker became chairman of the council. Walker's influence as a print collector was crucial in launching the gallery's Prints and Drawings Department, which opened in 1911.

Another responsibility of the council was to advise on the Victoria Memorial Museum (Ottawa's present Natural History Museum), which opened in 1913. The same year the National Gallery of Canada Act was passed with an independent Board of Trustees constituted; Walker was appointed chairman and served until his death. Its trustees were charged, among other duties, with the development, encouragement and cultivation of "correct artistic taste in the fine arts." By 1924, this collection had over 4,000 items.

== Canada's "war pictures" ==
Walker was key in the creation of what today is the collection of First World War "war pictures" now housed in the Canadian War Museum in Ottawa. In 1915, the Canadian financier and expatriate, William Maxwell Aitken (later Lord Beaverbrook), was appointed the Canadian force's official records officer in England. Beaverbrook established the Canadian War Memorials Fund to record for posterity the events of that war. As both a member of the fund's committee and chairman of the Board of Trustees of the National Gallery, Walker insisted that the commissioned artists include Canadians, as well as the British artists Beaverbrook proposed. By 1918, a large number of Canadian artists, among them A.Y. Jackson and Frederick Varley, were in Europe sketching munitions factories and various theatres of operations where Canadians were active. Other artists, C.W. Jefferys among them, recorded the war effort at home in Canada. In 1921, the Beaverbrook-funded war collection was deposited with the National Gallery.

Walker also served on both the Canadian and British Commissions on War Records and Trophies, formed in 1918. In the Canadian plan, a gallery for the war pictures and a hall of trophies was to be built on Sussex Drive in Ottawa. Efforts to complete the building in 1922 and 1923 were unsuccessful and the paintings and trophies were loaned out. In 1971, the paintings were transferred from the National Gallery to the Canadian War Museum and now are displayed.

== Innisfree ==
For weekend retreats, Walker began to purchase land in 1890 at De Grassi Point in Innisfil Township, Simcoe County. "Innisfree", as his wife named it, became the centre of Walker's family life. There, he built "Broadeaves" designed by leading Canadian architect Frank Darling. Darling was the architect of the University of Toronto and designed many buildings associated with Walker such as Convocation Hall and Trinity College at the University of Toronto and the Canadian Bank of Commerce (now Commerce Court North) on King Street West in Toronto. In 1913–14, Walker built "Innisfree Farm" to further his interest in livestock husbandry. Innisfree was left in trust to his descendants as a private land trust. Managed today with the assistance of the Ontario Ministry of Natural Resources, Innisfree is designated an Area of Natural and Scientific Interest for its prairie grassland and remnants of an old growth forest ecosystem.

== Last years ==
Sir Byron Edmund Walker left his imprint on the financial, artistic, and intellectual development of Canada. A wizard of finance, skilled in the intricacies of exchange and international business, he molded a tiny bank into a national institution and was largely responsible for overhauling the Canadian banking system. Simultaneously he established a wide range of cultural icons - the National Gallery of Canada, the collection of "war pictures" forming the nucleus of the Canadian War Museum, the Art Gallery of Ontario, the Royal Ontario Museum, the Champlain Society, the federation of colleges that became the University of Toronto - and many more. An amateur paleontologist, he was also an author of note. He was knighted by King George V, was a Knight of Grace of the Order of the Hospital of St. John of Jerusalem, and Japan appointed him Honorary Japanese Consul-General. Walker died at the age of 75, on 27 March 1924. After his death, The Globe and Mail wrote this description of Walker: "Possibly no more versatile Canadian existed in his day and age; probably few others have done so much for Canada."

== Legacy ==
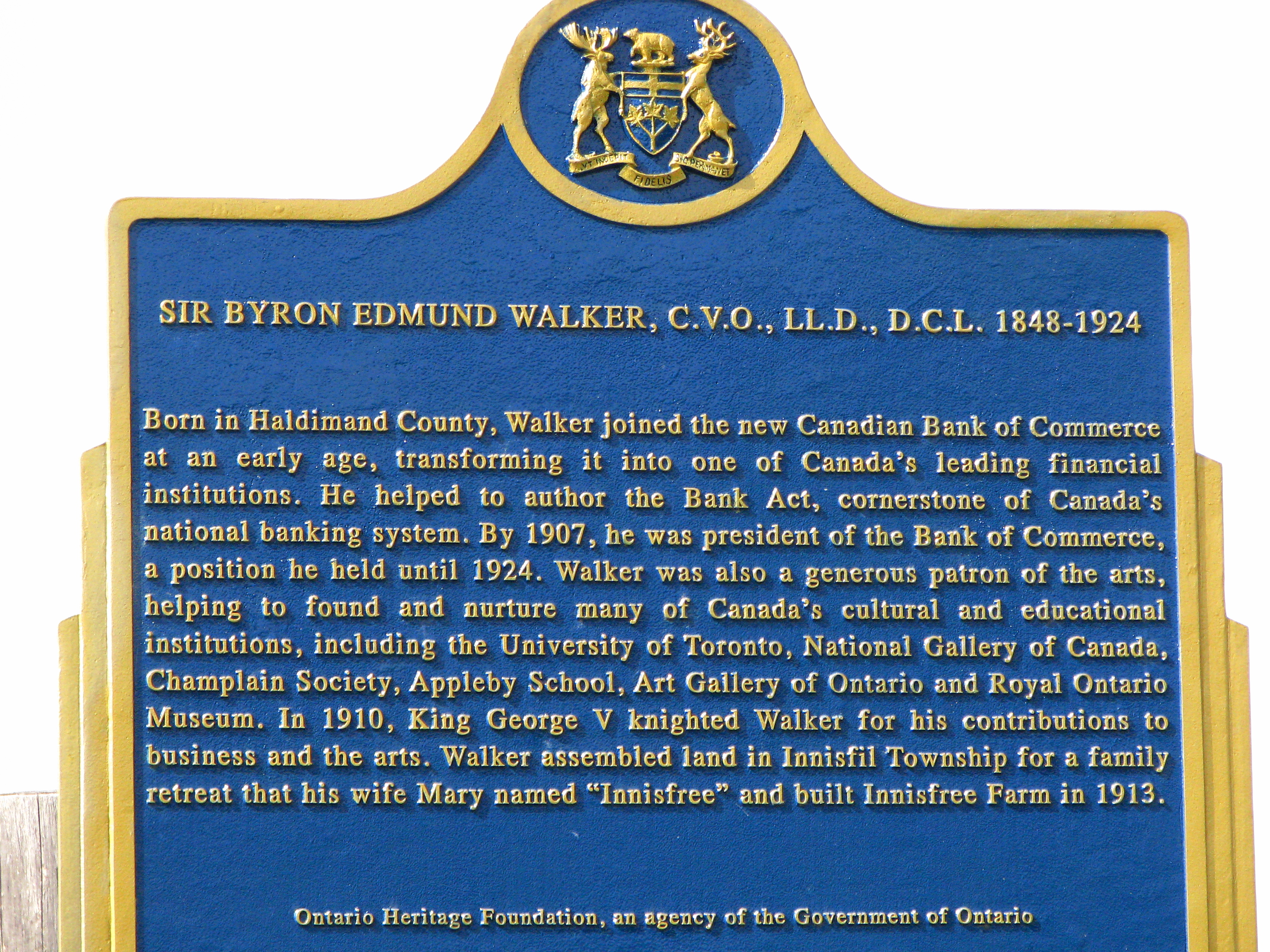
Plaque installed at Innisfil, Ontario

An Ontario Historical Plaque was erected by the province to commemorate Sir Byron Edmund Walker, C.V.O., LL.D., D.C.L. 1848-1924's role in Ontario's heritage.

== See also ==
- Bell Telephone Memorial

Academic offices
Preceded by William Ralph Meredith	Chancellor of the University of Toronto; 1923–1924	Succeeded by William Mulock
