= Waterous Engine Works Co. Ltd. =

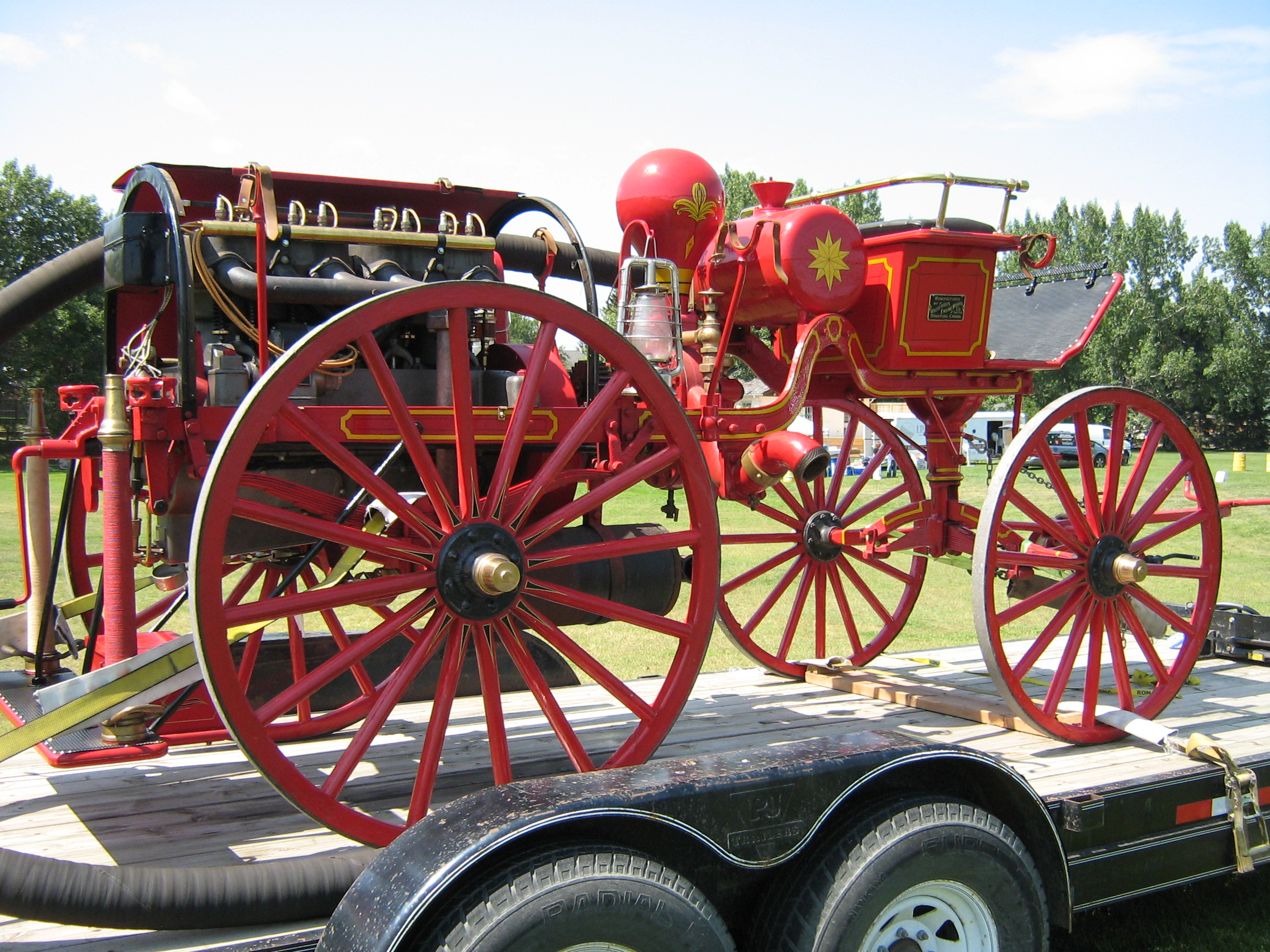
Waterous fire engine

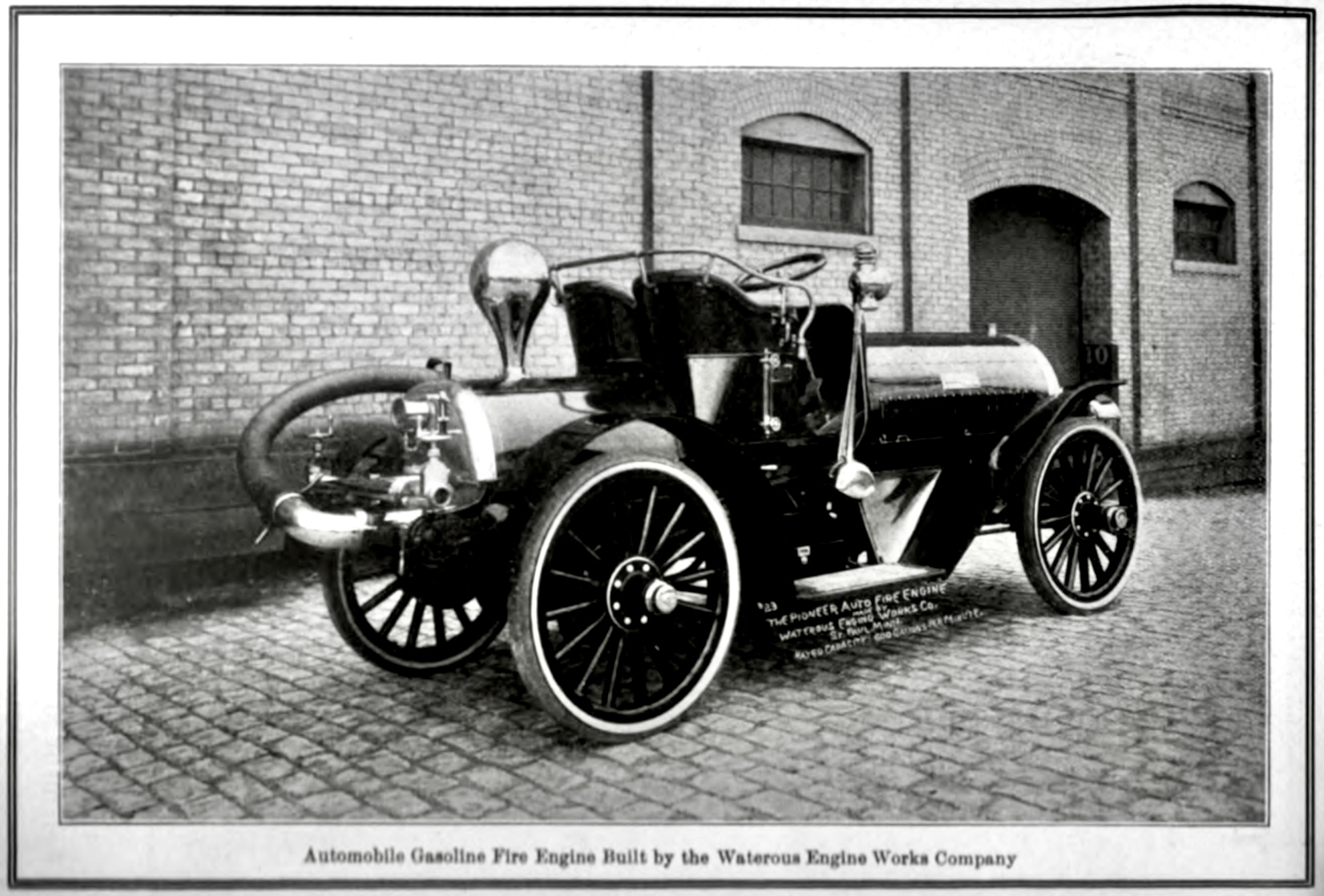
Waterous Engine Works Fire Engine (1908)

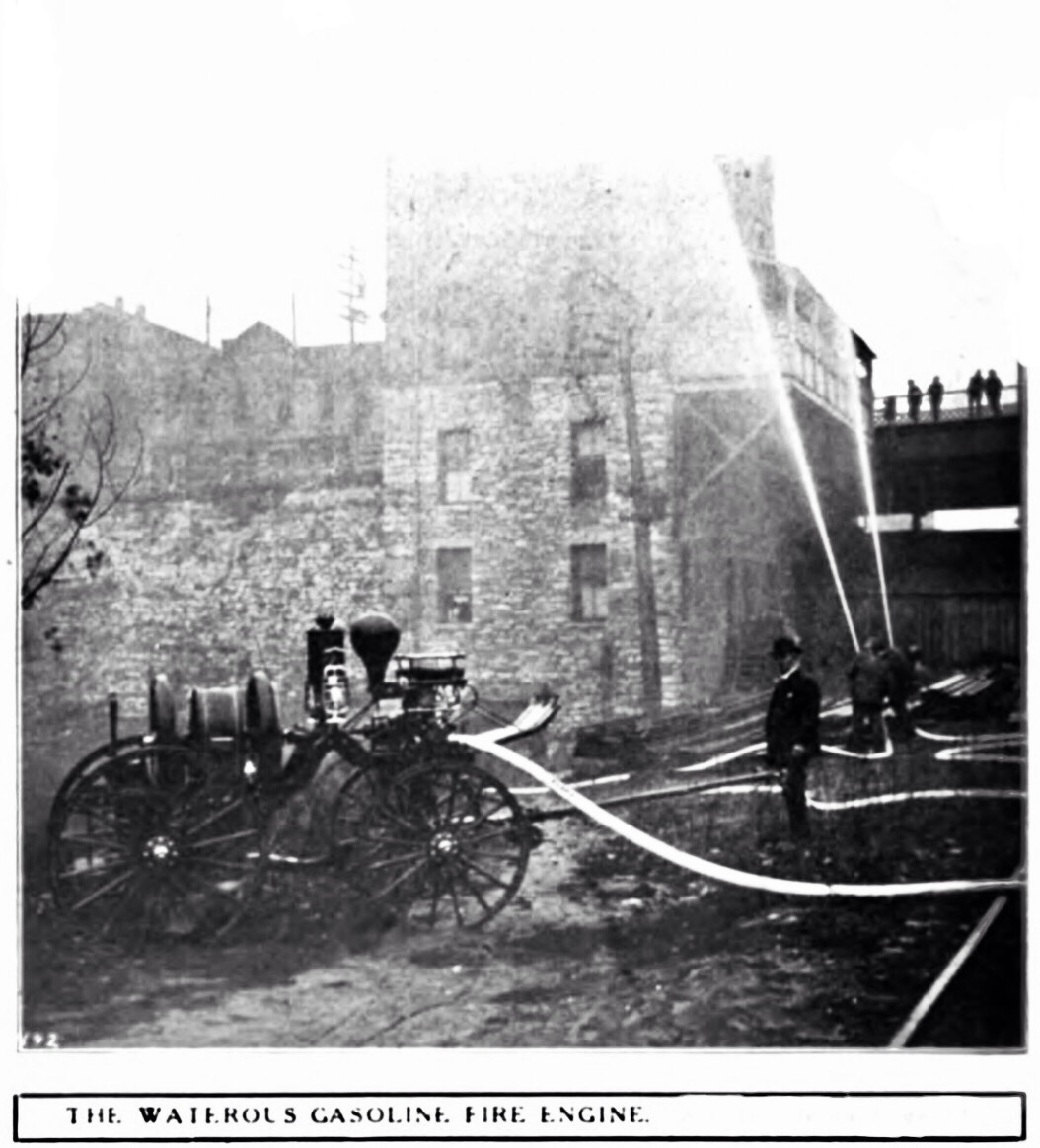
Waterous Engine Works Gasoline Fire Engine

The Waterous Engine Works was a famous Canadian farm and road engine builder. It made farm, road rollers and steam pumper fire equipment. It also made factory steam engines and marine engines. Many of their engines survive to this day in museums.

== See also ==
- Bell Telephone Memorial
