= George Christie Gibbons =

Sir George Christie Gibbons, KC (2 July 1848 in St. Catharines, Upper Canada – 8 August 1918) was a Canadian lawyer and businessman. The chairman of the Canadian section of the International Waterways Commission, he was knighted in 1911 for his part in the conclusion of the Boundary Waters Treaty of 1909.
