= Pioneers, a Volunteer Network =

Nonprofit charitable organization

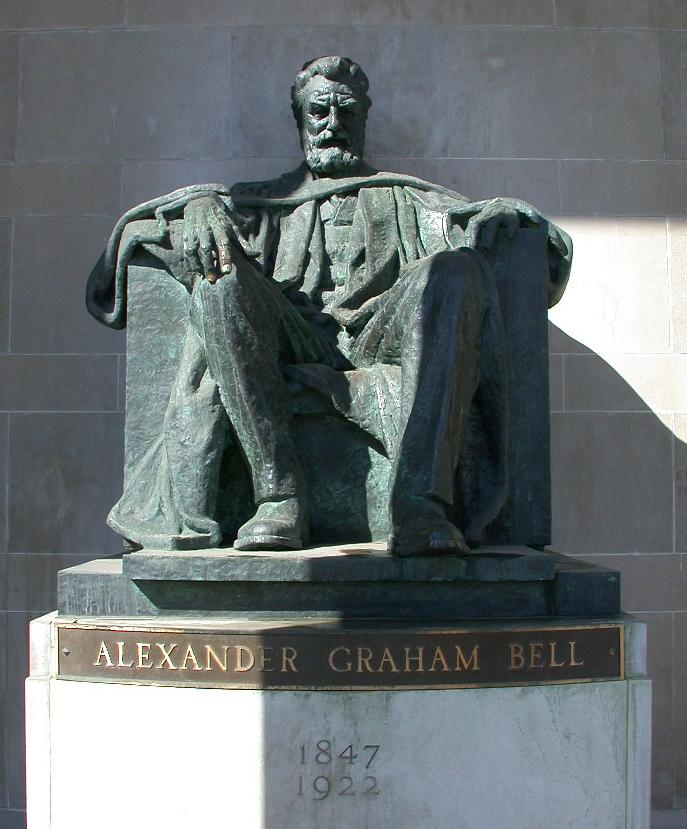
Bell statue dedicated by the Pioneers in 1949 at the Bell Telephone Building of Brantford. (Brantford Heritage Inventory, City of Brantford, Ontario)

Pioneers, a Volunteer Network, founded and more commonly known as the Telephone Pioneers of America, is a non-profit charitable organization based in Denver, Colorado in the United States. The association was organized in Boston in November 1911 by 246 pioneers active in the early days of telephony, including Alexander Graham Bell who received membership card No. 1. The first elected president was Theodore N. Vail, president of the American Telephone and Telegraph Company (AT&T).

As of 2009 the organization has grown to about 620,000 members, consisting primarily of actively employed and retired employees in the telecommunications industry, making it one of the world's largest corporate volunteer organizations. Pioneers volunteer more than ten million hours annually responding to the individual needs of their communities throughout the United States and Canada. It is funded through company sponsors and public charitable donations. In the United States, the organization is registered as a 501(c)(3) non-profit organization.

== History and mission ==
Pioneers is a network of volunteers who effect immediate, tangible change in local communities, in partnership with their sponsors. The history of the Pioneers is tied closely to the science and technology of telephones. The need to communicate gave impetus to Alexander Graham Bell, whose fascination was bolstered by his concern for those whose hearing was impaired or non-existent. With the able assistance of Thomas Watson and the support of several others, the rest became telephone history. And for the men and women who took part as Bell's invention and enterprise blossomed and grew, it was the foundation of a new industry and the beginning of many careers.

In 1910, AT&T's Henry W. Pope suggested the industry's success warranted more than paychecks and job satisfaction. Many of the people who pioneered the industry and who had spent 20 or 30 years together indicated they would like to stay in touch. However, Pope wondered, where were all those who had started out in the industry? The question sent both Pope and his office mate, Charles R. Truex, to their desks to compile lists of old friends and co-workers. Thomas Doolittle, already retired, was quick to join the effort, and the notion of the Telephone Pioneers of America was born. Once completed, the list was presented to Theodore N. Vail, then president of AT&T, who concurred in the plans and suggested an annual gathering of the group.

The first meeting of the fledgling Telephone Pioneers of America convened on November 1 and 2, 1911, at the Hotel Somerset in Boston, where Bell signed as the first charter member and Vail, who would serve for nine years, was elected the organization's first president. Membership was initially limited to those with 21 years of industry service, a standard that stood for 53 years, In the beginning, friendship and fellowship were its primary goal, recalling the facts, traditions, and memories of the early history of the telephone. The service requirement was gradually reduced over time and today, any employee of one of the organization's sponsor companies can become a member on the first day of employment.

The focus of the organization has changed as well. Those who wrote the original Pioneers purpose were forward thinking in adding that it would also encourage "such other meritorious objects consistent with the foregoing as may be desirable." That became what would make the Pioneers different from other industry groups. In 1958, Pioneers adopted community service as a core value, and in 1959 adopted a new motto: 'United To Serve Others'.

Since 1921, membership was divided into groups and local chapters, which began their own initiatives, mostly working with children's groups. Telephone Pioneers of America evolved into TelecomPioneers in 2002 to better reflect the shift from basic telephone service to broader telecommunications provided by the companies that support and sponsor Pioneers projects. These include AT&T, Bell Aliant, FairPoint Communications, Frontier Communications, Legacy West, formerly Qwest, SaskTel, the Verizon Foundation and the self sponsored New Outlook Pioneers group composed of employees and retirees of Lucent Technologies, Avaya Communication, and Agere Systems. In 2009, the organization's name further evolved into just Pioneers, a Volunteer Network. Today, the organization is the world's largest group of industry-specific employees and retirees dedicated to community service.

== Service areas ==
=== Education ===
Pioneers educational programs address the needs of young people, with an emphasis on literacy, personal development, technological skills, mentoring and other education-related support that promote learning, academic, career and economic success and inclusiveness for all – including several programs with specifically designed components for those who are disadvantaged or experience disabilities. Volunteer work in this area includes collecting, reading and donating books to children, helping improve reading comprehension skills using Pioneers' innovative, online program Power Up To Read, providing schools, after school centers and libraries with computers, collecting, assembling and donating backpacks of school supplies for needy students and painting maps of the United States and Canada on playgrounds.

=== Life enrichment ===
Pioneers care for people with disabilities and for senior citizens. Life enrichment projects include building wheelchair ramps, building custom tricycles known as Hot Trikes and teaching seniors how to use computers and cellphones.

=== Health and human services ===
Pioneers reach out help our neighbors in need in times of crisis from stocking food pantries to responding when natural disasters strike by providing supplies and shelter.

=== Environment ===
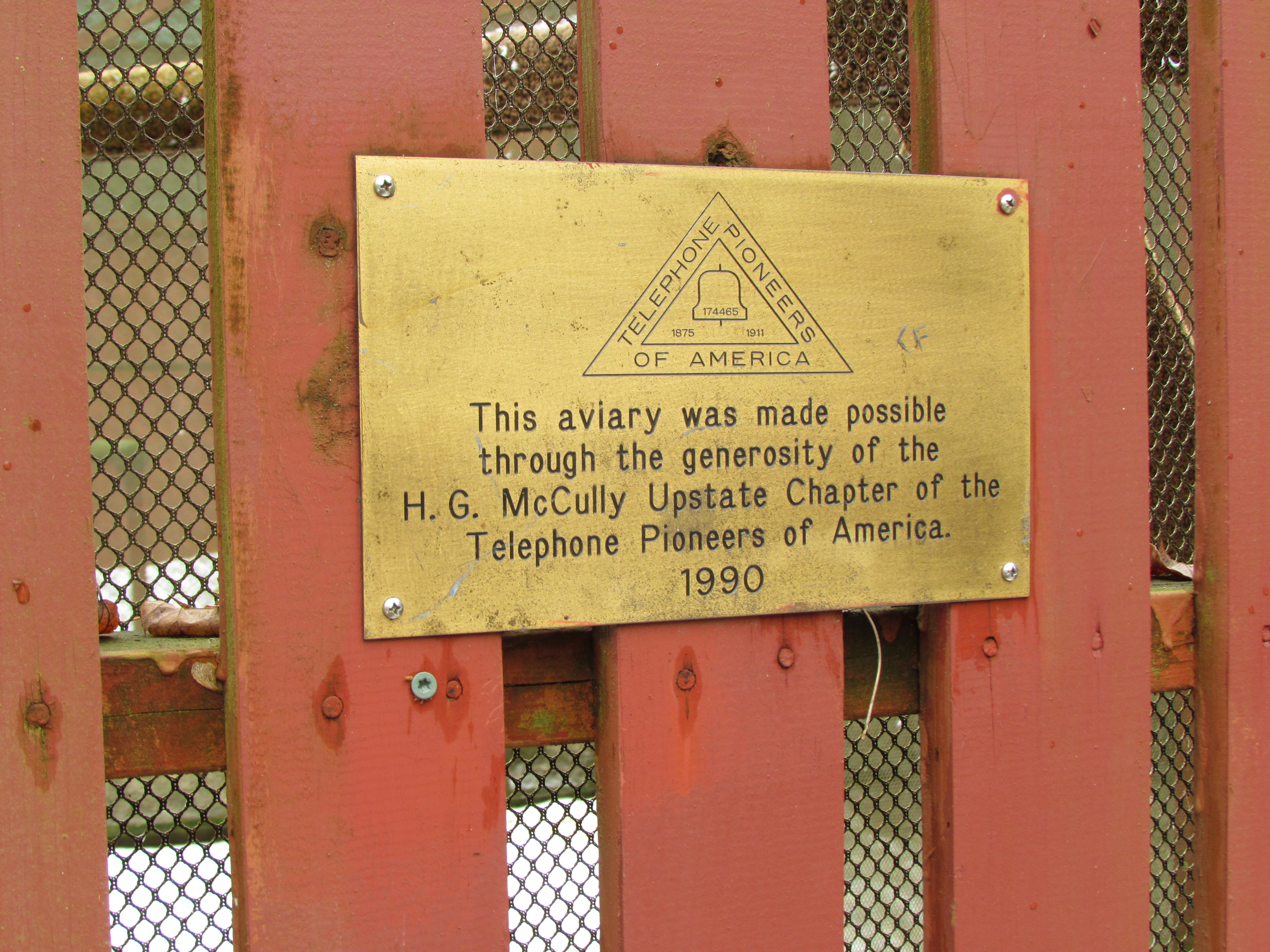
Telephone Pioneers of America donation plaque at The Raptor Trust

Many of the Pioneers' local projects developed over the past 100 years have been geared toward improving the environment. The environmental and beautification initiatives have included planting trees, bushes and flowers native to the local environment, picking up litter along roads, beaches, and parks, recycling items such as phone books, cell phones and printer cartridges, educating school-aged children on how to reduce, reuse and recycle, and refurbishing and donating used computers. Their efforts led to Telephone Pioneers of America Park in Phoenix, Arizona.

=== Military ===
Pioneers' projects that support servicemen and women, veterans and their families include collecting and recycling used cell phones to purchase prepaid phone cards, collecting and donating supplies (diapers, children's clothes, school supplies, etc.) for soldier's families, collecting supplies for comfort kits including toiletries, games, snacks, reading material, phone cards, etc. and sending to those serving overseas, cleaning, painting and landscaping homes for deployed soldiers as well as veterans and cleaning up, beautifying and posting flags at military gravesites.

== Organizational structure and local chapters ==
The Pioneers' headquarters were originally located in New York City but moved to Denver, Colorado in 1991. As of 2018 there are five groups of Pioneers:

- AT&T Pioneers
- Canadian Pioneers
- New Outlook Pioneers
- Legacy West Pioneers
- New Vision Pioneers

These groups are composed of Pioneers chapters located throughout the United States and Canada. Many of these chapters additionally have Pioneers clubs and councils.

== National partnerships ==
Pioneers partners with these organizations to strengthen its volunteer programs:

- Junior Achievement (JA) relies heavily on volunteers to support their mission and programs and to make a difference with children. Pioneers' partnership with JA encourages, supports, and educates children to flourish in the modern world through Job Shadow Day which combines Junior Achievement's work with the Pioneers program Project Connect.
- Through the Library of Congress, The National Library Service (NLS) uses the Talking Books Program to assist people who are unable to read standard print material due to visual and/or physical impairments. NLS provides Braille and recorded books and magazines that can be borrowed, free of charge, or delivered by postage-free mail to those in need. Pioneers help NLS and their patrons by repairing and refurbishing the cassette and record players used in the Talking Book Program. Pioneers refurbish approximately 70,000 cassette and record players every year, and have maintained more than 2.1 million players over four decades.
- The National Beep Baseball Association (NBBA) manages the annual Beep Ball World Series, which brings together blind athletes from all across the world to compete in the game. While the NBBA coordinates all the logistics for the tournament, Pioneers volunteers support the NBBA by giving their time and talents to the local tournaments and the World Series and adopting beep balls.

== Historical dedications ==
=== Franklin School commemoration ===
In 1947, the Pioneers Chapters, then called Telephone Pioneers of America, celebrated the centenary of the birth of Alexander Graham Bell with banquets and other events. They also dedicated a plaque on the wall of the Franklin School at 13th & K Streets NW in Washington, D.C., honoring Bell's invention of the Photophone, the precursor of fibre-optical communications, and which he referred to as his 'greatest invention'. The plaque read:

"From the top floor of this building • Was sent on June 3, 1880 • Over a beam of light to 1325 'L' Street • The first wireless telephone message • In the history of the world. • The apparatus used in sending the message • Was the Photophone invented by • Alexander Graham Bell • inventor of the telephone • This plaque was placed here by • Alexander Graham Bell Chapter • Telephone Pioneers of America...".

=== Bell statue by Cleeve Horne ===
In June 1949, the Charles Fleetford Sise Chapter of the Telephone Pioneers commissioned and dedicated a large statue of Bell in the front portico of Brantford, Ontario's new Bell Telephone Building plant on Market Street. Attending the formal ceremony were Bell's daughter, Mrs. Gillbert Grosvenor, Frederick Johnson, President of the Bell Telephone Company of Canada, T.N. Lacy, President of the Telephone Pioneers, and Brantford Mayor Walter J. Dowden. The statue had been designed and crafted by A.E. Cleeve Horne in his Toronto studio, and cast in bronze in Corona, New York by Salvatore Schiavo. On each side of the monument is the engraved inscription, "In Grateful Recognition of the Inventor of the Telephone". The statue has been likened in style to the Lincoln Memorial statue in Washington, D.C., by Daniel Chester French. The dedication of the Bell statue was broadcast nationally by the Canadian Broadcasting Corporation.

=== Thomas Philip Henderson ===
On June 12, 1954 approximately 30 officers and several dozen members of the Pioneers paid homage to a former and original telephone pioneer, Reverend Thomas Philip Henderson, at Perth, Ontario's Elmwood Cemetery. The Telephone Pioneers who attended were principally from the 7,900-member division of the Pioneer's Charles Fleetford Sise Chapter in Ontario and Quebec, attending a three-day conference in the city where Henderson was interred after his death in 1887. Approximately 200 Pioneers and other dignitaries attended the graveside memorial service where a plaque in Henderson's memory was unveiled, which was also attended by his great-granddaughter.

In 1870 Alexander Melville Bell immigrated to Canada with his wife, his ailing son Alexander Graham Bell (wasting from tuberculosis) and his widowed daughter-in-law. After landing at Quebec City on 1 August 1870, the Bells boarded a train to Montreal and later to Paris, Ontario, to stay at the parsonage of the Reverend Thomas Philip Henderson, a Baptist minister and close family friend who likely went to school with Melville in Scotland. After a brief stay of only a few days with Rev. Henderson, the Bell family purchased a farmhouse and orchard of 5 1/4 hectares (13 acres) on the outskirts of Brantford, Ontario, for $2,600, which is now the Bell Homestead National Historic Site. The Bells were likely helped in their search by the advance efforts of Reverend Henderson.

Alexander Melville Bell appointed Henderson as his phone company's general agent "for the Dominion of Canada" after Melville received 75% of the phone's Canadian patent rights from his son Alexander Graham in 1877. In September 1877 the Bells' installed a 5 1/4 km (3 1/4 mile) telephone line from their homestead to connect to Reverend Henderson's house in downtown Brantford. Henderson later moved to join the Bell Telephone Company of Canada at their Montreal headquarters, where he became their purchasing agent and storekeeper until his death in 1887.

== See also ==
- Telephone Pioneers of America Park
