= Telephone Pioneers of America Park =

Phoenix, Arizona, adaptive recreation park

- Telephone Pioneers Park
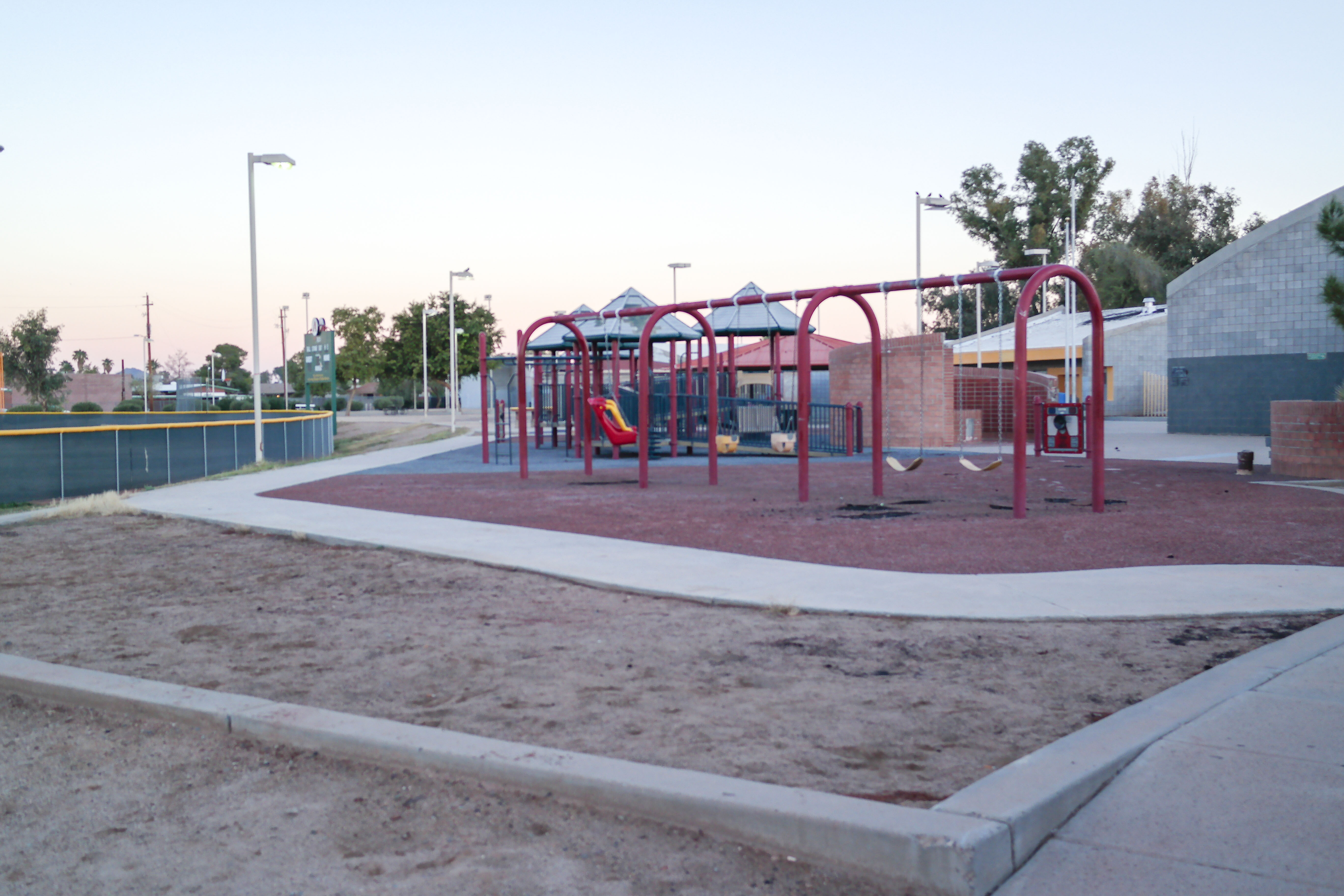
- Interactive map of Telephone Pioneers of America Park
- Location: 1946 West Morningside Drive; Phoenix, Arizona 85023
- Coordinates: 33.6489°N 112.1016°W
- Operator: Phoenix Parks and Recreation Department

Telephone Pioneers of America Park, also known as Telephone Pioneers Park or Telephone Park, is an adaptive recreation park serving the needs of physically disabled persons in Phoenix, Arizona. The park opened in 1988 from private donations collected by the Telephone Pioneers of America and is the first barrier-free park in the United States. Managed by the Phoenix Parks and Recreation Department, the park features two beep baseball fields, a therapeutic pool, a wheelchair-accessible playground, an 18-station exercise course, racquetball, volleyball, tennis, basketball and shuffleboard. Picnic facilities with open shelters known as ramadas are available.

== See also ==
- Assistive technology in sport
- Disabled Sports USA
