= Alexander Graham Bell =

Inventor of the telephone (1847–1922)

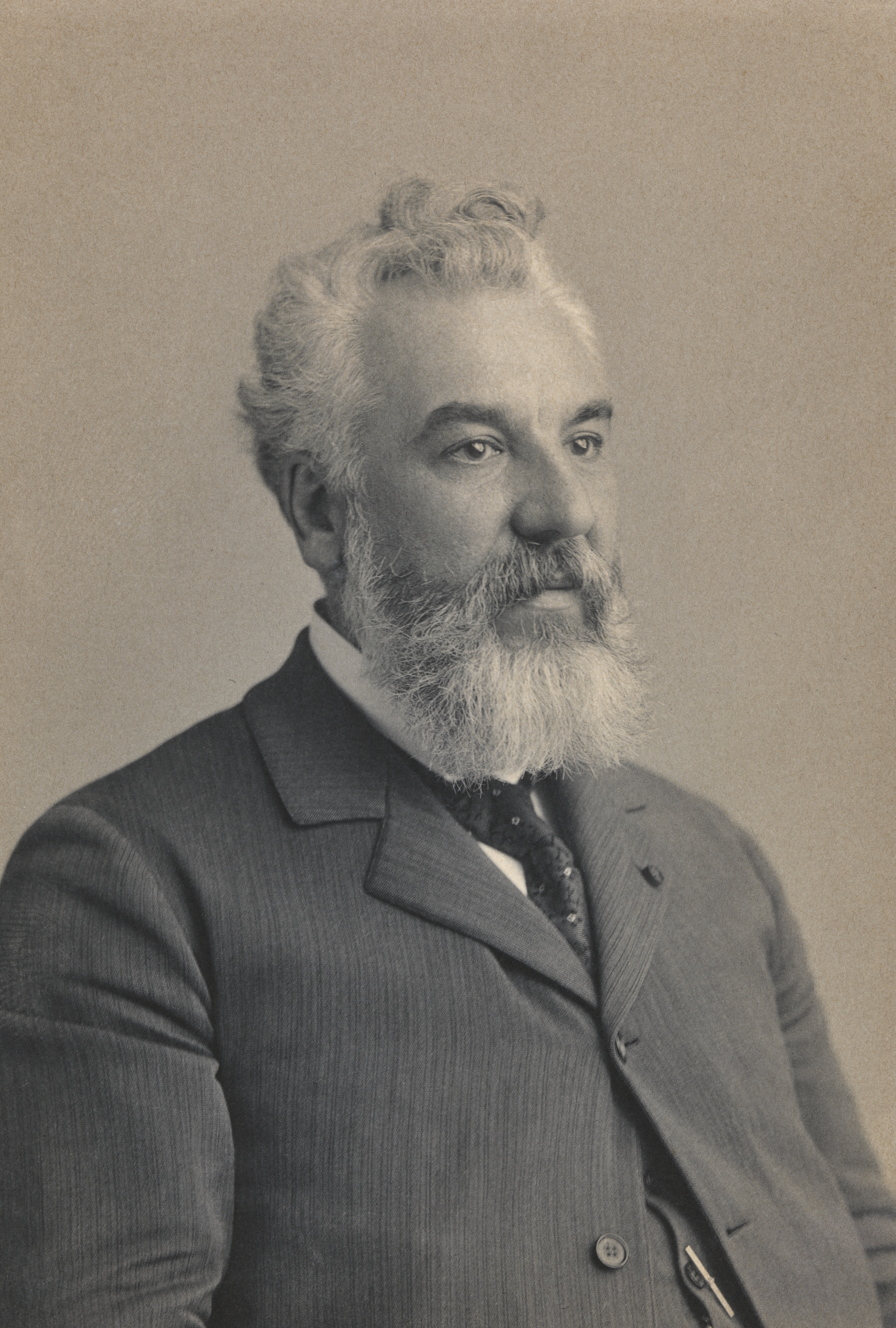
- Bell, c. 1895
- Born: Alexander Bell; March 3, 1847; Edinburgh, Scotland
- Died: August 2, 1922 (aged 75); Beinn Bhreagh, Nova Scotia, Canada
- Citizenship: United Kingdom (1847–1922); British-subject in Canada (1870–1882); United States (1882–1922)
- Education: University of Edinburgh; University College London
- Occupations: Inventor; scientist; engineer; professor; teacher of the deaf
- Known for: Invention of the telephone Co-founder of Bell Telephone Company, Bell Canada and AT&T
- Spouse: Mabel Gardiner Hubbard (m. 1877)
- Children: 4
- Father: Alexander Melville Bell
- Relatives: Gardiner G. Hubbard (father-in-law); David C. Bell (uncle); Gilbert H. Grosvenor (son-in-law); David Fairchild (son-in-law); Melville Bell Grosvenor (grandson); Mabel Grosvenor (granddaughter); A. Graham Bell Fairchild (grandson); Gilbert Grosvenor (great-grandson); Edwin Grosvenor (great-grandson); Chichester Bell (cousin)
- Awards: Volta Prize (1880); Membership of NAS (1883); Albert Medal (1902); John Fritz Medal (1907); Elliott Cresson Medal (1912); Hughes Medal (1913); AIEE Edison Medal (1914)
- Bell's voice Re-identified in 2013, Bell made this wax-disc recording of his voice in 1885.

Alexander Graham Bell (/ˈɡreɪ.əm/; born Alexander Bell; March 3, 1847 – August 2, 1922) was a Scottish-born (Note: Bell was a British subject for most of his early life. When he moved to Canada in 1870, Canadian and British citizenship were functionally identical, with Canadian citizenship only becoming a formal classification in 1910. He applied for American citizenship after 1877, gained it in 1882, and referred to himself as an American citizen from that point on. Quote from Bell speaking to his wife: "you are a citizen because you can't help it – you were born one, but I chose to be one." Aside from Bell's own view of his citizenship, many, if not most Canadians considered him also as one of theirs as evidenced in an address by the Governor General of Canada. On October 24, 1917, in Brantford, Ontario, the Governor General spoke at the unveiling of the Bell Telephone Memorial to an audience numbering in the thousands, saying: "Dr. Bell is to be congratulated upon being able to receive the recognition of his fellow citizens and fellow countrymen".) Canadian-American inventor, scientist, and engineer who is credited with patenting the first practical telephone. He also co-founded the American Telephone and Telegraph Company (AT&T) in 1885.

Bell's father, grandfather, and brother had all been associated with work on elocution and speech, and both his mother and wife were deaf, profoundly influencing Bell's life's work. His research on hearing and speech further led him to experiment with hearing devices, which eventually culminated in his being awarded the first U.S. patent for the telephone, on March 7, 1876. (Note: From Black (1997), p. 18: "He thought he could harness the new electronic technology by creating a machine with a transmitter and receiver that would send sounds telegraphically to help people hear.") Bell considered his invention an intrusion on his real work as a scientist and refused to have a telephone in his study. (Note: After Bell's death his wife Mabel wrote to John J. Carty, an AT&T vice-president, and commented on her husband's reluctance to have a phone in his study, saying "[of the statements in the newspapers] ... publishing of Mr. Bell's dislike of the telephone. Of course, he never had one in his study. That was where he went when he wanted to be alone with his thoughts and his work. The telephone, of course, means intrusion by the outside world. And the little difficulties and delays often attending the establishment of conversation... did irritate him, so that as a rule he preferred having others send and receive messages. But all really important business over the telephone he transacted himself. There are few private houses more completely equipped with telephones than ours ... and there was nothing that Mr. Bell was more particular about than our telephone service ... We never could have come here [to Beinn Bhreagh] in the first place or continued here, but for the telephone which kept us in close touch with doctors and neighbours and the regular telegraph office ... Mr. Bell did like to say in fun, "Why did I ever invent the Telephone," but no one had a higher appreciation of its indispensableness or used it more freely when need was—either personally or by deputy—and he was really tremendously proud of it and all it was accomplishing.")

Many other inventions marked Bell's later life, including ground-breaking work in optical telecommunications, hydrofoils, and aeronautics. Bell also had a strong influence on the National Geographic Society and its magazine while serving as its second president from 1898 to 1903. For National Geographic, Bell wrote under the pseudonym H. A. Largelamb, an anagram of his name.

Beyond his work in engineering, Bell had a deep interest in the emerging science of heredity. His work in this area has been called "the soundest, and most useful study of human heredity proposed in nineteenth-century America ... Bell's most notable contribution to basic science, as distinct from invention."

== Early life ==
Bell was born in Edinburgh, Scotland, on March 3, 1847, to Alexander Melville Bell, a phonetician, and Eliza Grace Bell (née Symonds). The family home was on South Charlotte Street in Edinburgh, where a stone inscription marks it as Bell's birthplace. He had two brothers: Melville James Bell (1845–1870) and Edward Charles Bell (1848–1867), who both died of tuberculosis. He was born as just "Alexander Bell". At age 10, however, he made a plea to his father to have a middle name like his two brothers. (Note: Bell typically signed his name in full on his correspondence.) For his 11th birthday, his father acquiesced and allowed him to adopt the name "Graham", chosen out of respect for Alexander Graham, a Canadian being treated by his father who was also a family friend. To close relatives and friends he remained "Aleck". Bell and his siblings attended a Presbyterian Church in their youth.

=== First invention ===
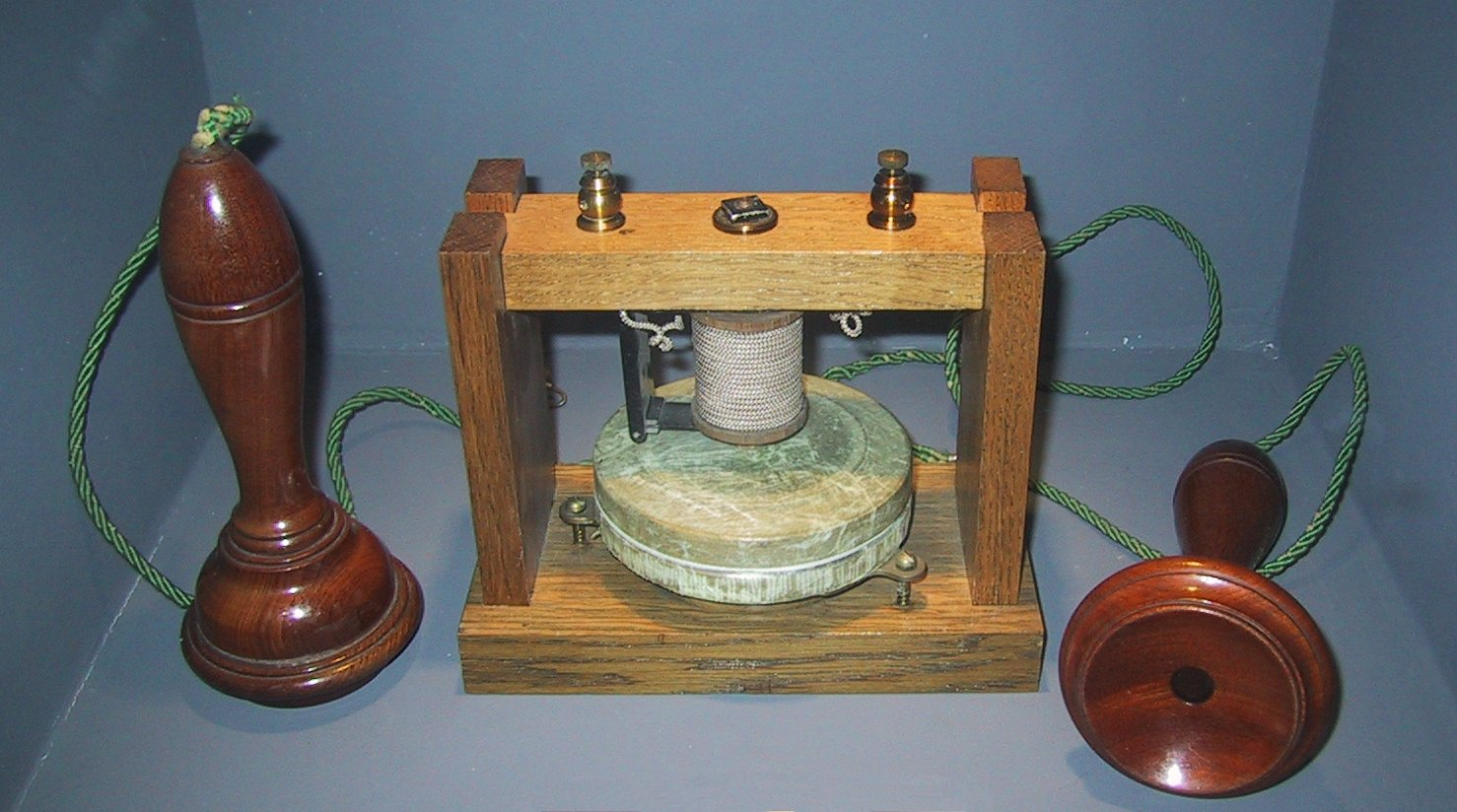
Bell system 1877

As a child, Bell displayed a curiosity about his world; he gathered botanical specimens and ran experiments at an early age. His best friend was Ben Herdman, a neighbour whose family operated a flour mill. At the age of 12, Bell built a homemade device that combined rotating paddles with sets of nail brushes, creating a simple dehusking machine that was put into operation at the mill and used steadily for a number of years. In return, Ben's father John Herdman gave both boys the run of a small workshop in which to "invent".

From his early years, Bell showed a sensitive nature and a talent for art, poetry, and music that his mother encouraged. With no formal training, he mastered the piano and became the family's pianist. Though normally quiet and introspective, he revelled in mimicry and "voice tricks" akin to ventriloquism that entertained family guests. Bell was also deeply affected by his mother's gradual deafness (she began to lose her hearing when he was 12), and learned a manual finger language so he could sit at her side and tap out silently the conversations swirling around the family parlour. He also developed a technique of speaking in clear, modulated tones directly into his mother's forehead, whereby she would hear him with reasonable clarity. Bell's preoccupation with his mother's deafness led him to study acoustics.

His family was long associated with the teaching of elocution: his grandfather, Alexander Bell, in London, his uncle in Dublin, and his father, in Edinburgh, were all elocutionists. His father published a variety of works on the subject, several of which are still well known, especially The Standard Elocutionist (1860), which appeared in Edinburgh in 1868. The Standard Elocutionist appeared in 168 British editions and sold over 250,000 copies in the United States alone. It explains methods to instruct deaf-mutes (as they were then known) to articulate words and read other people's lip movements to decipher meaning. Bell's father taught him and his brothers not only to write Visible Speech but to identify any symbol and its accompanying sound. Bell became so proficient that he became a part of his father's public demonstrations and astounded audiences with his abilities. He could decipher Visible Speech representing virtually every language, including Latin, Scottish Gaelic, and even Sanskrit, accurately reciting written tracts without any prior knowledge of their pronunciation.

=== Education ===
As a young child, Bell, like his brothers, was schooled at home by his father. At an early age, he was enrolled at the Royal High School in Edinburgh. But he left at age 15, having completed only the first four forms. His school record was undistinguished, marked by absenteeism and lacklustre grades. His main interest remained in the sciences, especially biology, while he treated other school subjects with indifference, to his father's dismay. Upon leaving school, Bell travelled to London to live with his grandfather, Alexander Bell, on Harrington Square. During the year he spent with his grandfather, a love of learning was born, with long hours spent in serious discussion and study. The elder Bell took great efforts to have his young pupil learn to speak clearly and with conviction, attributes he would need to become a teacher himself. At age 16, Bell secured a position as a "pupil-teacher" of elocution and music at Weston House Academy in Elgin, Moray, Scotland. Although enrolled as a student in Latin and Greek, he instructed classes himself in return for board and £10 per session. The next year, he attended the University of Edinburgh, joining his brother Melville, who had enrolled there the previous year. In 1868, Bell completed his matriculation exams and was accepted for admission to University College London, though he did not complete his studies, as his family emigrated to Canada in 1870 following the deaths of his brothers Edward and Melville from tuberculosis.

=== First experiments with sound ===
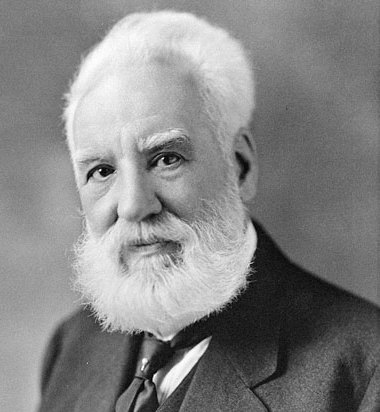
Portrait of Alexander Graham Bell

Bell's father encouraged his interest in speech and, in 1863, took his sons to see a unique automaton developed by Sir Charles Wheatstone based on the earlier work of Baron Wolfgang von Kempelen. The rudimentary "mechanical man" simulated a human voice. Bell was fascinated by the machine, and after he obtained a copy of von Kempelen's book, published in German, and had laboriously translated it, he and Melville built their own automaton head. Their father, highly interested in their project, offered to pay for any supplies and spurred the boys on with the enticement of a "big prize" if they were successful. While his brother constructed the throat and larynx, Bell tackled the more difficult task of recreating a realistic skull. His efforts resulted in a remarkably lifelike head that could "speak", albeit only a few words. The boys would carefully adjust the "lips" and when a bellows forced air through the windpipe, a very recognizable Mama ensued, to the delight of neighbours who came to see the invention.

Intrigued by the results of the automaton, Bell continued to experiment with a live subject, the family's Skye Terrier, Trouve. After he taught it to growl continuously, Bell would reach into its mouth and manipulate the dog's lips and vocal cords to produce a crude-sounding "Ow ah oo ga ma ma". With little convincing, visitors believed his dog could articulate "How are you, grandmama?" Indicative of his playful nature, his experiments convinced onlookers that they saw a "talking dog". These initial forays into experimentation with sound led Bell to undertake his first serious work on the transmission of sound, using tuning forks to explore resonance.

At age 19, Bell wrote a report on his work and sent it to philologist Alexander Ellis, a colleague of his father. Ellis immediately wrote back indicating that the experiments were similar to existing work in Germany, and also lent Bell a copy of Hermann von Helmholtz's work, The Sensations of Tone as a Physiological Basis for the Theory of Music.

Dismayed to find that groundbreaking work had already been undertaken by Helmholtz, who had conveyed vowel sounds by means of a similar tuning fork "contraption", Bell pored over the book. Working from his own erroneous mistranslation of a French edition, Bell fortuitously then made a deduction that would underpin all his future work on transmitting sound, reporting: "Without knowing much about the subject, it seemed to me that if vowel sounds could be produced by electrical means, so could consonants, so could articulate speech." He also later remarked: "I thought that Helmholtz had done it ... and that my failure was due only to my ignorance of electricity. It was a valuable blunder ... If I had been able to read German in those days, I might never have commenced my experiments!" (Note: Helmholtz's The Sensations of Tone is credited with inspiring Bell, at the age of 23, to further his studies of electricity and electromagnetism.)

=== Family tragedy ===
In 1865, when the Bell family moved to London, Bell returned to Weston House as an assistant master and, in his spare hours, continued experiments on sound using a minimum of laboratory equipment. Bell concentrated on experimenting with electricity to convey sound and later installed a telegraph wire from his room in Somerset College to that of a friend. Throughout late 1867, his health faltered mainly through exhaustion. His brother Edward was similarly affected by tuberculosis. While Bell recovered (by then referring to himself in correspondence as "A. G. Bell") and served the next year as an instructor at Somerset College, Bath, England, his brother's condition deteriorated. Edward never recovered. Upon his brother's death, Bell returned home in 1867. Melville had married and moved out. With aspirations to obtain a degree at University College London, Bell considered his next years preparation for the degree examinations, devoting his spare time to studying.

Helping his father in Visible Speech demonstrations and lectures brought Bell to Susanna E. Hull's private school for the deaf in South Kensington, London. His first two pupils were deaf-mute girls who made remarkable progress under his tutelage. While Melville seemed to achieve success on many fronts, including opening his own elocution school, applying for a patent on an invention, and starting a family, Bell continued as a teacher. In May 1870, Melville died from complications of tuberculosis, causing a family crisis. His father had also experienced a debilitating illness earlier in life and been restored to health by convalescence in Newfoundland. Bell's parents embarked upon a long-planned move when they realized that their remaining son was also sickly. Acting decisively, Alexander Melville Bell asked Bell to arrange for the sale of all the family property, (Note: The family pet was given to his brother's family.) conclude all his brother's affairs (Bell took on his last student, curing a pronounced lisp), and join his father and mother in setting out for Canada. Reluctantly, Bell also had to conclude a relationship with Marie Eccleston, who, as he had surmised, was not prepared to leave England with him.

== Canada ==
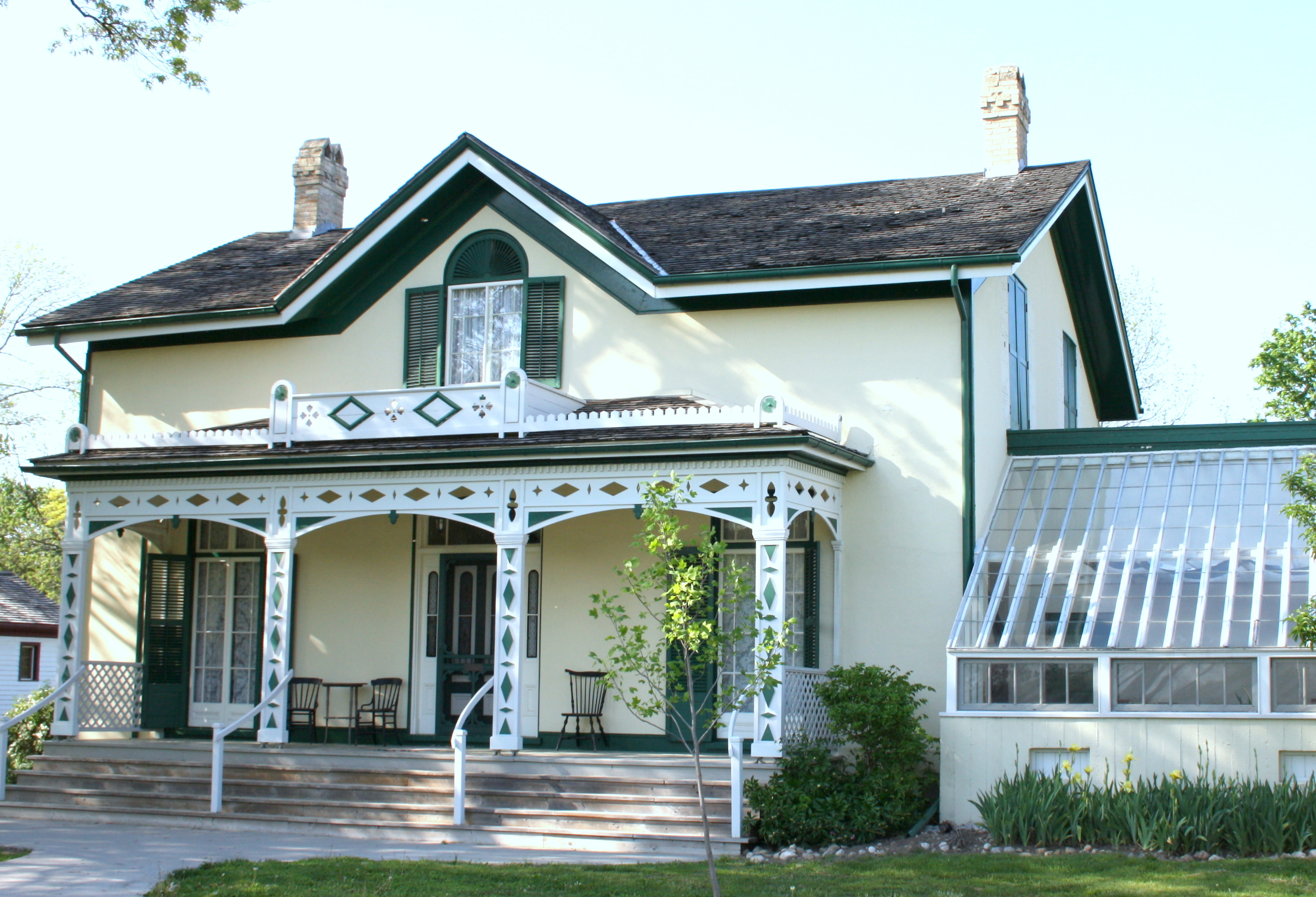
Melville House, the Bells' first home in North America, now a National Historic Site of Canada

In 1870, 23-year-old Bell travelled with his parents and his brother's widow, Caroline Margaret Ottaway, to Paris, Ontario, to stay with Thomas Henderson, a Baptist minister and family friend. The Bells soon purchased a farm of 10.5 acres (4.2 ha) at Tutelo Heights (now called Tutela Heights), near Brantford, Ontario. The property consisted of an orchard, large farmhouse, stable, pigsty, hen-house, and a carriage house, which bordered the Grand River. (Note: The estate, dating from 1858, is in the present day located at 94 Tutela Heights Road, Brantford, and is now known as the "Bell Homestead", and formally as the Bell Homestead National Historic Site of Canada. It received its historical designation from the Government of Canada on June 1, 1996.)

At the homestead, Bell set up a workshop in the converted carriage house near what he called his "dreaming place", a large hollow nestled in trees at the back of the property above the river. Despite his frail condition upon arriving in Canada, Bell found the climate and environs to his liking and rapidly improved. (Note: Bell would later write that he had come to Canada a "dying man".) He continued his interest in the study of the human voice, and when he discovered the Six Nations Reserve across the river at Onondaga, learned the Mohawk language and translated its unwritten vocabulary into Visible Speech symbols. For his work, Bell was awarded the title of Honorary Chief and participated in a ceremony where he donned a Mohawk headdress and danced traditional dances. (Note: Bell was thrilled at his recognition by the Six Nations Reserve and throughout his life would launch into a Mohawk war dance when he was excited.)

After setting up his workshop, Bell continued experiments based on Helmholtz's work with electricity and sound. He also modified a melodeon (a type of pump organ) to transmit its music electrically over a distance. Once the family was settled, Bell and his father made plans to establish a teaching practice and in 1871, he accompanied his father to Montreal, where Melville was offered a position to teach his System of Visible Speech.

== Work with deaf people ==
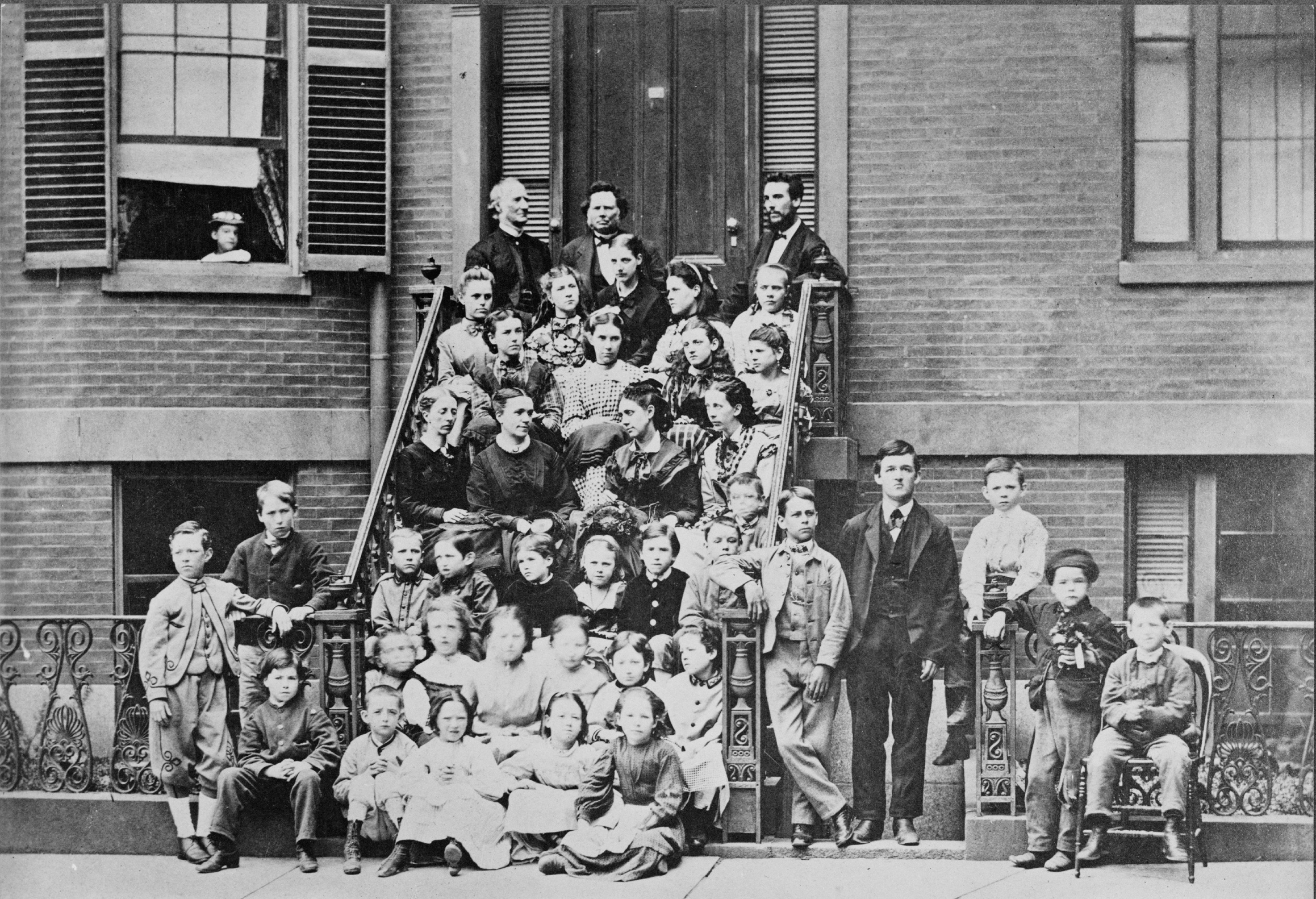
Bell, top right, providing pedagogical instruction to teachers at the Boston School for Deaf Mutes, 1871; throughout his life, he referred to himself as "a teacher of the deaf"

Bell's father was invited by Sarah Fuller, principal of the Boston School for Deaf Mutes (later to become the public Horace Mann School for the Deaf) to introduce the Visible Speech System by providing training for Fuller's instructors, but he declined the post in favour of his son. Travelling to Boston in April 1871, Bell proved successful in training the school's instructors. He was asked to repeat the programme at the American Asylum for Deaf-mutes in Hartford, Connecticut, and the Clarke School for the Deaf in Northampton, Massachusetts.

Returning home to Brantford after six months abroad, Bell continued his experiments with his "harmonic telegraph". (Note: In later years, Bell described the invention of the telephone and linked it to his "dreaming place".) The basic concept behind his device was that messages could be sent through a single wire if each was transmitted at a different pitch, but work on both the transmitter and receiver was needed.

Unsure of his future, he contemplated returning to London to complete his studies, but decided to return to Boston as a teacher. His father helped him set up his private practice by contacting Gardiner Greene Hubbard, the president of the Clarke School for the Deaf for a recommendation. Teaching his father's system, in October 1872, Alexander Bell opened his "School of Vocal Physiology and Mechanics of Speech" in Boston, which attracted a large number of deaf pupils, with his first class numbering 30 students. While he was working as a private tutor, one of his pupils was Helen Keller, who came to him as a young child unable to see, hear, or speak. She later said that Bell dedicated his life to the penetration of that "inhuman silence which separates and estranges". In 1893, Keller performed the sod-breaking ceremony for the construction of Bell's new Volta Bureau, dedicated to "the increase and diffusion of knowledge relating to the deaf".

In 1891, Bell established the American Association for the Promotion of the Teaching of Speech to the Deaf (AAPTSD) in New York and endowed the organization with a gift of $25,000. While endorsing the teaching of speech to the deaf, Bell remained neutral as to whether oral, manual or a combination of the three methods would best benefit the student.

Throughout his life, Bell sought to assimilate the deaf and hard of hearing with the broader population. He encouraged speech therapy and lip-reading as well as sign language. He outlined this in an 1898 paper detailing his belief that, with resources and effort, the deaf could be taught to read lips and speak (known as oralism), enabling their integration with wider society. Members of the Deaf community have criticized Bell for supporting lip-reading over the use of sign language.

== Continuing experimentation ==
In 1872, Bell became professor of Vocal Physiology and Elocution at the Boston University School of Oratory. During this period, he alternated between Boston and Brantford, spending summers in his Canadian home. At Boston University, Bell was "swept up" by the excitement engendered by the many scientists and inventors living in the city. He continued his research in sound and endeavoured to find a way to transmit musical notes and articulate speech, but although absorbed by his experiments, he found it difficult to devote enough time to experimentation. With days and evenings occupied by his teaching and private classes, Bell began to stay awake late into the night, running experiment after experiment in rented facilities at his boarding house. Keeping "night owl" hours, he worried that his work would be discovered and took great pains to lock up his notebooks and laboratory equipment. Bell had a specially made table where he could place his notes and equipment inside a locking cover. His health deteriorated as he had severe headaches. Returning to Boston in autumn 1873, Bell made a far-reaching decision to concentrate on his experiments in sound.

Giving up his lucrative private Boston practice, Bell retained only two students, six-year-old "Georgie" Sanders, deaf from birth, and 15-year-old Mabel Hubbard. Each played an important role in the next developments. Georgie's father, Thomas Sanders, a wealthy businessman, offered Bell a place to stay in nearby Salem with Georgie's grandmother, complete with a room to "experiment". Although the offer was made by Georgie's mother and followed the year-long arrangement in 1872 where her son and his nurse had moved to quarters next to Bell's boarding house, it was clear that Mr. Sanders backed the proposal. The arrangement was for teacher and student to continue their work together, with free room and board thrown in. Mabel was a bright, attractive girl ten years Bell's junior who became the object of his affection. Having lost her hearing after a near-fatal bout of scarlet fever close to her fifth birthday, (Note: Eber (1991), p. 43 claimed that Mabel had scarlet fever in New York "...shortly before her fifth birthday..."; however, Toward (1984) provided a detailed chronology of the event claiming "... shortly after their arrival in New York [in January 1863]" when Mabel would have been at least five years and five weeks of age. Mabel's exact age when she became deaf would later play a part in the debate on the effectiveness of manual versus oral education for deaf children, as children who are older at the onset of deafness retain greater vocalization skills and are thus more successful in oral education programmes. Some of the debate centred on whether Mabel had to relearn oral speech from scratch, or whether she never lost it.) she had learned to read lips but her father, Gardiner Greene Hubbard, Bell's benefactor and personal friend, wanted her to work directly with her teacher.

== The telephone ==
Alexander Graham Bell in 1876

External audio
- Alexander Graham Bell and Thomas Watson, 26:57, CBC Archives

By 1874, Bell's initial work on the harmonic telegraph had entered a formative stage, with progress made both at his new Boston "laboratory" (a rented facility) and at his family home in Canada a big success. (Note: From Alexander Graham Bell (1979), p. 8: "Brantford is justified in calling herself 'The Telephone City' because the telephone originated there. It was invented in Brantford at Tutela Heights in the summer of 1874.") While working that summer in Brantford, Bell experimented with a "phonautograph", a pen-like machine that could draw shapes of sound waves on smoked glass by tracing their vibrations. Bell thought it might be possible to generate undulating electrical currents that would correspond to sound waves. He also believed that he would be able to convert the undulating currents back into sound by tuning multiple metal reeds to different frequencies. But he had no working model to demonstrate the feasibility of these ideas.

In 1874, telegraph message traffic was rapidly expanding and, in the words of Western Union President William Orton, had become "the nervous system of commerce". Orton had contracted with inventors Thomas Edison and Elisha Gray to find a way to send multiple telegraph messages on each telegraph line to avoid the great cost of constructing new lines. When Bell mentioned to Gardiner Hubbard and Thomas Sanders that he was working on a method of sending multiple tones on a telegraph wire using a multi-reed device, the two began to financially support Bell's experiments. Patent matters were handled by Hubbard's patent attorney, Anthony Pollok.

In March 1875, Bell and Pollok visited the scientist Joseph Henry, then the director of the Smithsonian Institution, to ask his advice on the electrical multi-reed apparatus that Bell hoped would transmit the human voice by telegraph. Henry said Bell had "the germ of a great invention". When Bell said that he lacked the necessary knowledge, Henry replied, "Get it!" That declaration greatly encouraged Bell to keep trying, even though he had neither the equipment needed to continue his experiments nor the ability to create a working model of his ideas. But a chance meeting in 1874 between Bell and Thomas A. Watson, an experienced electrical designer and mechanic at the electrical machine shop of Charles Williams, changed that.

With financial support from Sanders and Hubbard, Bell hired Watson as his assistant, (Note: Hubbard's financial support to the research efforts fell far short of the funds needed, necessitating Bell to continue teaching while conducting his experiments. Bell was so short of funds at times that he had to borrow money from his own employee, Thomas Watson. Bell also sought an additional CAD$150 from the former Premier of Canada, George Brown, in exchange for 50% of the patent rights in the British Empire (Brown later retracted his offer to patent the telephone in the U.K. for fear of being ridiculed). The Bell Patent Association, composed of Hubbard, Sanders and Bell and which would become the precursor of the Bell Telephone Company (and later, AT&T), would later assign an approximate 10% interest of its shares to Watson, in lieu of salary and for his earlier financial support to Bell while they worked together creating their first functional telephone.) and the two experimented with acoustic telegraphy. On June 2, 1875, Watson accidentally plucked one of the reeds and Bell, at the receiving end of the wire, heard the reed's overtones that would be necessary for transmitting speech. That demonstrated to Bell that only one reed or armature was necessary, not multiple reeds. This led to the "gallows" sound-powered telephone, which could transmit indistinct, voice-like sounds, but not clear speech.

=== The race to the patent office ===
In 1875, Bell developed an acoustic telegraph and drew up a patent application for it. Since he had agreed to share U.S. profits with his investors, Gardiner Hubbard and Thomas Sanders, Bell requested that an associate in Ontario, George Brown, attempt to patent it in Britain, instructing his lawyers to apply for a patent in the U.S. only after they received word from Britain (Britain issued patents only for discoveries not previously patented elsewhere).

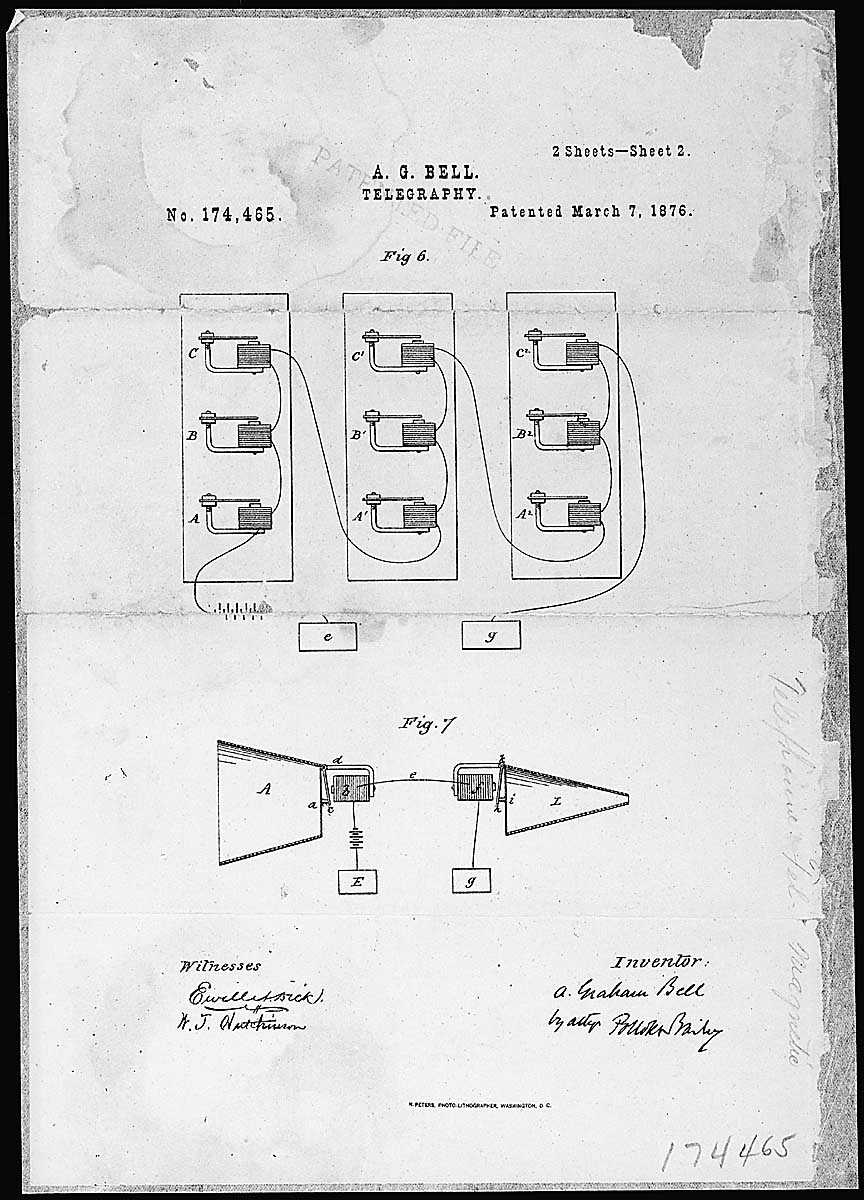
Alexander Graham Bell's telephone patent drawing, March 7, 1876

Meanwhile, Elisha Gray was also experimenting with acoustic telegraphy and thought of a way to transmit speech using a water transmitter. On February 14, 1876, Gray filed a caveat with the U.S. Patent Office for a telephone design that used a water transmitter. That same morning, Bell's lawyer filed Bell's application with the patent office. There is considerable debate about who arrived first and Gray later challenged the primacy of Bell's patent. Bell was in Boston on February 14 and did not arrive in Washington until February 26.

On March 7, 1876, the U.S. Patent Office issued Bell patent 174,465. It covered "the method of, and apparatus for, transmitting vocal or other sounds telegraphically ... by causing electrical undulations, similar in form to the vibrations of the air accompanying the said vocal or other sound" (Note: A copy of a draft of the patent application is shown, described as "probably the most valuable patent ever.") Bell returned to Boston that day and the next day resumed work, drawing in his notebook a diagram similar to that in Gray's patent caveat.

On March 10, Bell succeeded in getting his telephone to work, using a liquid transmitter similar to Gray's design. Vibration of the diaphragm caused a needle to vibrate in the water, varying the electrical resistance in the circuit. When Bell spoke the sentence "Mr. Watson—Come here—I want to see you" into the liquid transmitter, Watson, listening at the receiving end in an adjoining room, heard the words clearly.

Although Bell was, and still is, accused of stealing the telephone from Gray, Bell used Gray's water transmitter design only after Bell's patent had been granted, and only as a proof of concept scientific experiment, to prove to his own satisfaction that intelligible "articulate speech" (Bell's words) could be electrically transmitted. After March 1876, Bell focused on improving the electromagnetic telephone and never used Gray's liquid transmitter in public demonstrations or commercial use.

The examiner raised the question of priority for the variable resistance feature of the telephone before approving Bell's patent application. He told Bell that his claim for the variable resistance feature was also described in Gray's caveat. Bell pointed to a variable resistance device in his previous application in which he described a cup of mercury, not water. He had filed the mercury application at the patent office on February 25, 1875, long before Gray described the water device. In addition, Gray abandoned his caveat, and because he did not contest Bell's priority, the examiner approved Bell's patent on March 3, 1876. Gray had reinvented the variable resistance telephone, but Bell was the first to write down the idea and test it in a telephone.

The patent examiner, Zenas Fisk Wilber, later stated in an affidavit that he was an alcoholic who was much in debt to Bell's lawyer, Marcellus Bailey, with whom he had served in the Civil War. He said he had shown Bailey Gray's patent caveat. Wilber also said (after Bell arrived in Washington D.C. from Boston) that he showed Bell Gray's caveat and that Bell paid him $100 (equivalent to $2,900 in 2025). Bell said they discussed the patent only in general terms, although in a letter to Gray, Bell admitted that he learned some of the technical details. Bell denied in an affidavit that he ever gave Wilber any money.

=== Later developments ===
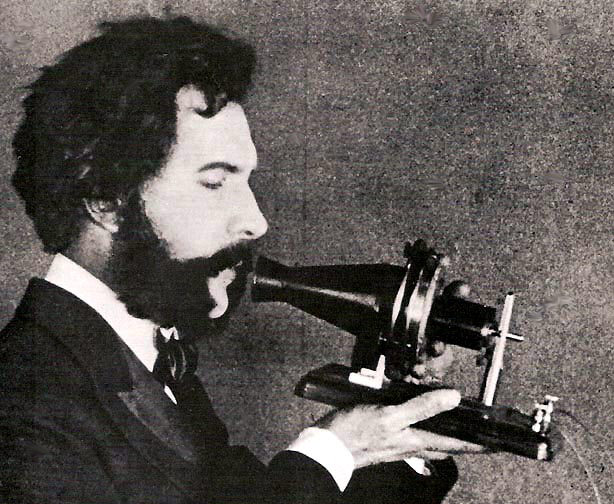
An actor playing Bell in a 1926 film holds Bell's first telephone transmitter

On March 10, 1876, Bell used "the instrument" in Boston to call Thomas Watson who was in another room but out of earshot. He said, "Mr. Watson, come here – I want to see you" and Watson soon appeared at his side.

Continuing his experiments in Brantford, Bell brought home a working model of his telephone. On August 3, 1876, from the telegraph office in Brantford, Bell sent a telegram to the village of Mount Pleasant four miles (six kilometres) away, indicating that he was ready. He made a telephone call via telegraph wires and faint voices were heard replying. The following night, he amazed guests as well as his family with a call between the Bell Homestead and the office of the Dominion Telegraph Company in Brantford along an improvised wire strung up along telegraph lines and fences, and laid through a tunnel. This time, guests at the household distinctly heard people in Brantford reading and singing. The third test, on August 10, 1876, was made via the telegraph line between Brantford and Paris, Ontario, eight miles (thirteen kilometres) away. This test is said by many sources to be the "world's first long-distance call". It proved that the telephone could work over long distances, at least as a one-way call.

The first two-way (reciprocal) conversation over a line occurred between Cambridge and Boston (roughly 2.5 miles) on October 9, 1876. During that conversation, Bell was on Kilby Street in Boston and Watson was at the offices of the Walworth Manufacturing Company.

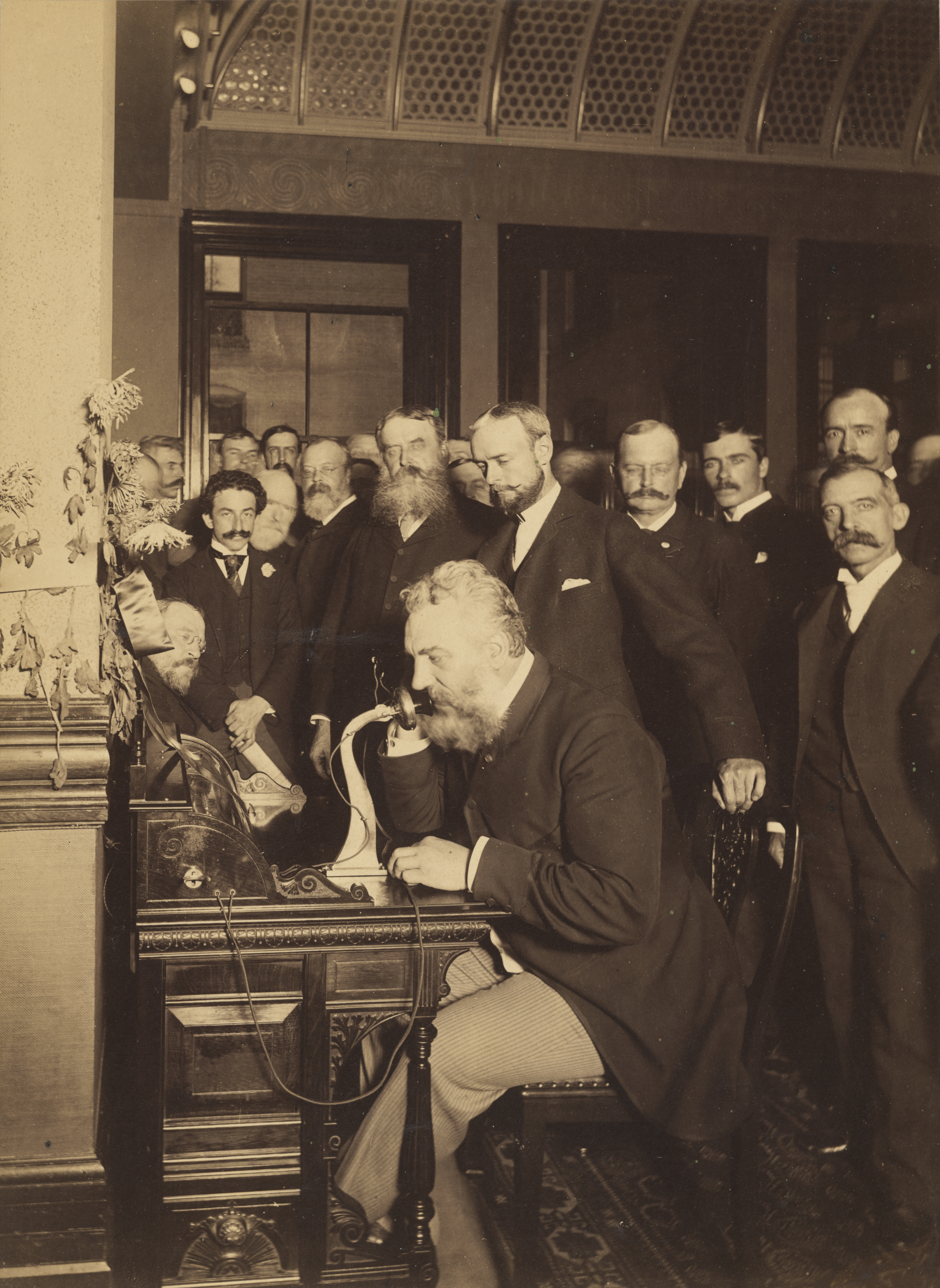
Bell at the opening of the long-distance line from New York to Chicago in 1892

Bell and his partners, Hubbard and Sanders, offered to sell the patent outright to Western Union for $100,000, equal to $3,023,438 today, but it did not work (according to an apocryphal story, the president of Western Union balked, countering that the telephone was nothing but a toy). Two years later, he told colleagues that if he could get the patent for $25 million (equal to $834,051,724 today), he would consider it a bargain. By then, the Bell company no longer wanted to sell the patent. Bell's investors became millionaires while he fared well from residuals and at one point had assets of nearly $1 million.

Bell began a series of public demonstrations and lectures to introduce the new invention to the scientific community as well as the general public. A short time later, his demonstration of an early telephone prototype at the 1876 Centennial Exposition in Philadelphia brought the telephone to international attention. Influential visitors to the exhibition included Emperor Pedro II of Brazil. One of the judges at the Exhibition, Sir William Thomson (later Lord Kelvin), a renowned Scottish scientist, described the telephone as "the greatest by far of all the marvels of the electric telegraph".

On January 14, 1878, at Osborne House, on the Isle of Wight, Bell demonstrated the device to Queen Victoria, placing calls to Cowes, Southampton, and London. These were the first publicly witnessed long-distance telephone calls in the UK. The queen found the process "quite extraordinary" although the sound was "rather faint". She later asked to buy the equipment that was used, but Bell offered to make "a set of telephones" specifically for her.

The Bell Telephone Company was created in 1877, and by 1886, more than 150,000 people in the U.S. owned telephones. Bell Company engineers made numerous other improvements to the telephone, which emerged as one of the most successful products ever. In 1879, the company acquired Edison's patents for the carbon microphone from Western Union. This made the telephone practical for longer distances, and it was no longer necessary to shout to be heard at the receiving telephone.

Pedro II of Brazil was the first person to buy stock in the Bell Telephone Company. One of the first telephones in a private residence was installed in his palace in Petrópolis, his summer retreat forty miles (sixty-four kilometres) from Rio de Janeiro.

In January 1915, Bell made the first ceremonial transcontinental telephone call. Calling from the AT&T head office at 15 Dey Street in New York City, Bell was heard by Thomas Watson at 333 Grant Avenue in San Francisco. The New York Times reported:

On October 9, 1876, Alexander Graham Bell and Thomas A. Watson talked by telephone to each other over a two-mile wire stretched between Cambridge and Boston. It was the first wire conversation ever held. Yesterday afternoon [on January 25, 1915], the same two men talked by telephone to each other over a 3,400-mile wire between New York and San Francisco. Dr. Bell, the veteran inventor of the telephone, was in New York, and Mr. Watson, his former associate, was on the other side of the continent.

=== Competitors ===
As is sometimes common in scientific discoveries, simultaneous developments occurred, as evidenced by a number of inventors who were at work on the telephone. Over 18 years, the Bell Telephone Company faced 587 court challenges to its patents, including five that went to the U.S. Supreme Court, but none was successful in establishing priority over Bell's original patent, and the Bell Telephone Company never lost a case that had proceeded to a final trial stage. Bell's laboratory notes and family letters were the key to establishing a long lineage to his experiments. The Bell company lawyers successfully fought off myriad lawsuits generated initially around the challenges by Elisha Gray and Amos Dolbear. In personal correspondence to Bell, both Gray and Dolbear had acknowledged his prior work, which considerably weakened their later claims.

On January 13, 1887, the U.S. government moved to annul the patent issued to Bell on the grounds of fraud and misrepresentation. After a series of decisions and reversals, the Bell company won a decision in the Supreme Court, though a couple of the original claims from the lower court cases were left undecided. By the time the trial had wound its way through nine years of legal battles, the U.S. prosecuting attorney had died and the two Bell patents (No. 174,465, dated March 7, 1876, and No. 186,787, dated January 30, 1877) were no longer in effect, although the presiding judges agreed to continue the proceedings due to the case's importance as a precedent. With a change in administration and charges of conflict of interest (on both sides) arising from the original trial, the U.S. attorney general dropped the lawsuit on November 30, 1897, leaving several issues undecided on the merits.

During a deposition filed for the 1887 trial, Italian inventor Antonio Meucci also claimed to have created the first working model of a telephone in Italy in 1834. In 1886, in the first of three cases in which he was involved, (Note: Meucci was not involved in the final trial.) Meucci took the stand as a witness in hope of establishing his invention's priority. Meucci's testimony was disputed due to lack of material evidence for his inventions, as his working models were purportedly lost at the laboratory of American District Telegraph (ADT) of New York, which was incorporated as a subsidiary of Western Union in 1901. Meucci's work, like that of many other inventors of the period, was based on earlier acoustic principles and, despite evidence of earlier experiments, the final case involving Meucci was eventually dropped upon Meucci's death. But due to the efforts of Congressman Vito Fossella, on June 11, 2002, the U.S. House of Representatives stated that Meucci's "work in the invention of the telephone should be acknowledged". This did not put an end to the still contentious issue. Some modern scholars do not agree that Bell's work on the telephone was influenced by Meucci's inventions. (Note: Tomas Farley also writes that "Nearly every scholar agrees that Bell and Watson were the first to transmit intelligible speech by electrical means. Others transmitted a sound or a click or a buzz but our boys [Bell and Watson] were the first to transmit speech one could understand.")

The value of Bell's patent was acknowledged throughout the world, and patent applications were made in most major countries. When Bell delayed the German patent application, the electrical firm Siemens & Halske set up a rival manufacturer of Bell telephones under its own patent. Siemens produced near-identical copies of the Bell telephone without having to pay royalties. The establishment of the International Bell Telephone Company in Brussels, Belgium, in 1880, as well as a series of agreements in other countries eventually consolidated a global telephone operation. The strain put on Bell by his constant appearances in court, necessitated by the legal battles, eventually resulted in his resignation from the company. (Note: Many of the lawsuits became rancorous, with Elisha Gray becoming particularly bitter over Bell's ascendancy in the telephone debate, but Bell refused to launch a countersuit for libel.)

== Family life ==
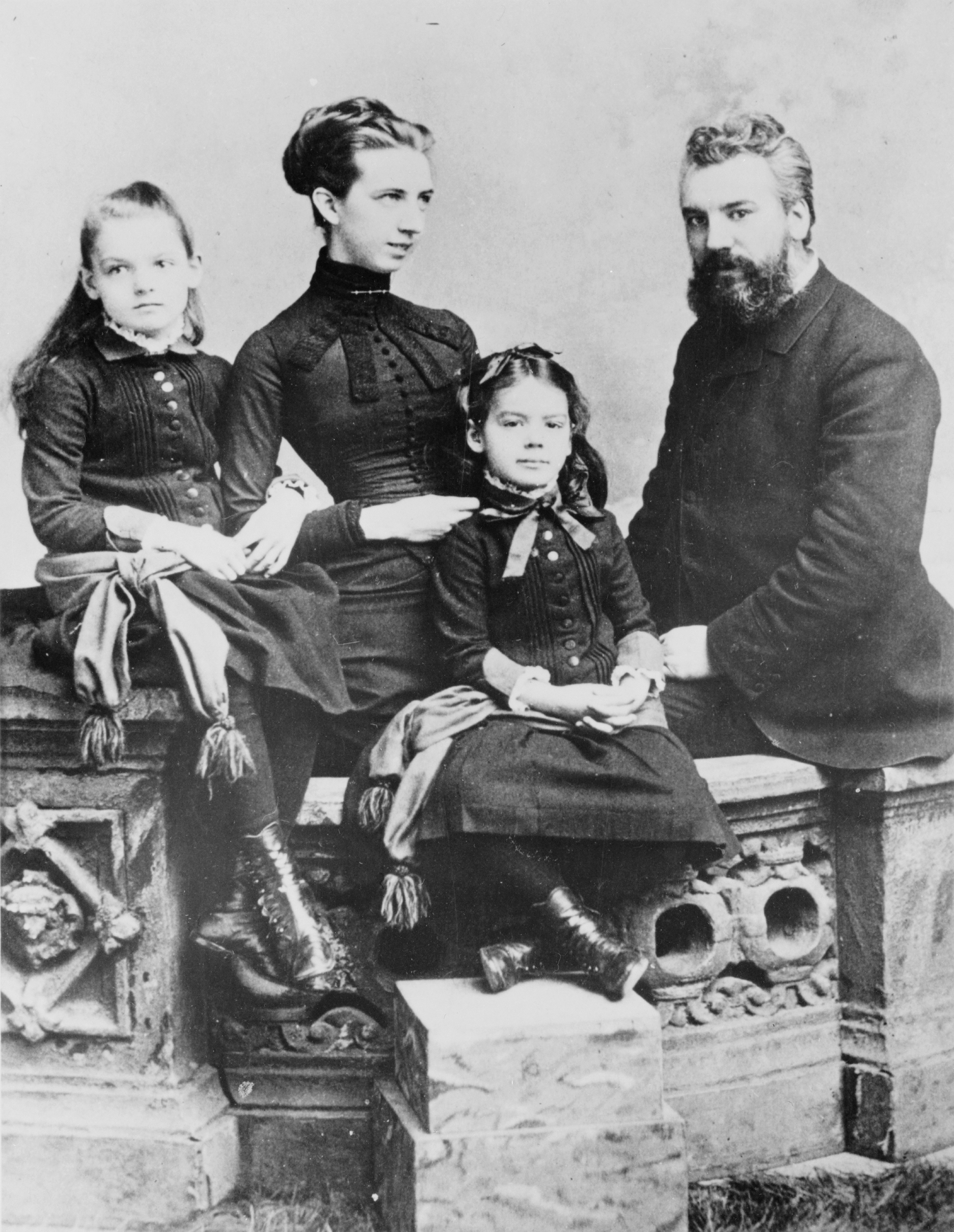
Alexander Graham Bell, his wife Mabel Gardiner Hubbard, and their daughters Elsie (left) and Marian c. 1885

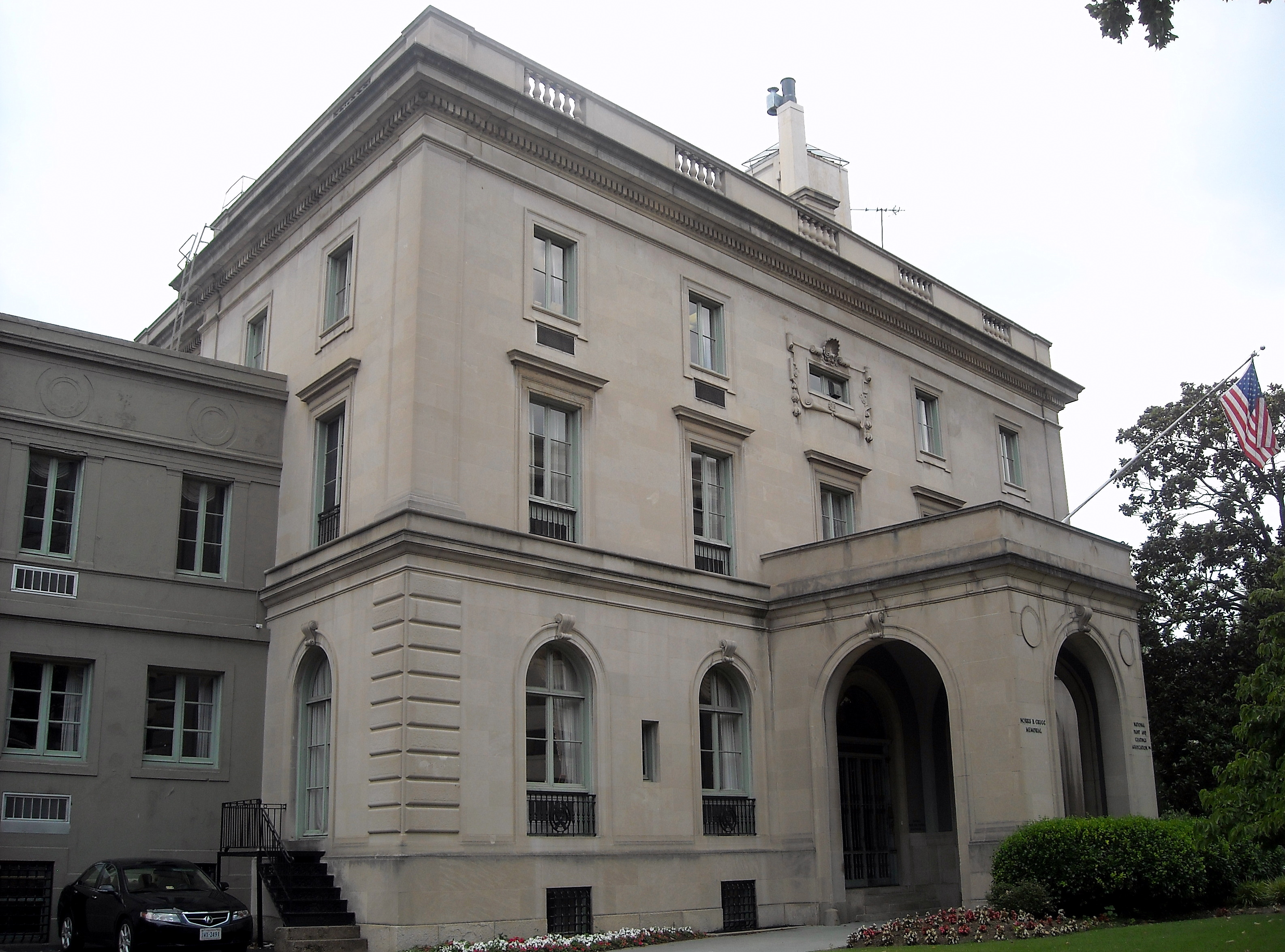
The Brodhead–Bell mansion, the Bell family residence in Washington, D.C., from 1882 to 1889

On July 11, 1877, a few days after the Bell Telephone Company was established, Bell married Mabel Hubbard (1857–1923) at the Hubbard estate in Cambridge, Massachusetts. Mabel was the daughter of his patron Gardiner Greene Hubbard (the first president of the National Geographic Society). She was deaf as a result of scarlet fever and was a student of Graham Bell. His wedding present to his bride was to turn over 1,487 of his 1,497 shares in the newly formed Bell Telephone Company. Shortly thereafter, the newly-weds embarked on a year-long honeymoon in Europe. During that excursion, Bell took a handmade model of his telephone with him, making it a "working holiday". The courtship had begun years earlier; however, Bell waited until he was more financially secure before marrying. Although the telephone appeared to be an "instant" success, it was not initially a profitable venture and Bell's main sources of income were from lectures until after 1897. One unusual request exacted by his fiancée was that he use "Alec" rather than the family's earlier familiar name of "Aleck". From 1876, he would sign his name "Alec Bell". They had four children:

- Elsie May Bell (1878–1964) who married Gilbert Hovey Grosvenor of National Geographic fame.
- Marian Hubbard Bell (1880–1962) who was referred to as "Daisy". Married David Fairchild. (Note: Marian was born only days after Bell and his assistant Sumner Tainter had successfully tested their new wireless telecommunication invention at their Volta Laboratory, one which Bell would name as his greatest achievement. Bell was so ecstatic that he wanted to jointly name his new invention and his new daughter Photophone (Greek: "light–sound"), Bell wrote: "Only think!—Two babies in one week! Mabel's baby was light enough at birth but mine was LIGHT ITSELF! Mabel's baby screamed inarticulately but mine spoke with distinct enunciation from the first." Bell's suggested scientific name for their new infant daughter did not go over well with Marian's mother, Mabel Gardiner Hubbard Bell.)
- Two sons who died in infancy (Edward in 1881 and Robert in 1883).

The Bell family home was in Cambridge, Massachusetts, until 1880 when Bell's father-in-law bought a house in Washington, D.C.; in 1882 he bought a home in the same city for Bell's family, so they could be with him while he attended to the numerous court cases involving patent disputes.

Bell was a British subject throughout his early life in Scotland and later in Canada until 1882 when he became a naturalized citizen of the United States. In 1915, he characterized his status as: "I am not one of those hyphenated Americans who claim allegiance to two countries." Despite this declaration, Bell has been proudly claimed as a "native son" by all three countries he resided in: the United States, Canada, and the United Kingdom.

By 1885, a new summer retreat was contemplated. That summer, the Bells had a vacation on Cape Breton Island in Nova Scotia, Canada, spending time at the small village of Baddeck. Returning in 1886, Bell started building an estate on a point across from Baddeck, overlooking Bras d'Or Lake. By 1889, a large house, christened The Lodge was completed and two years later, a larger complex of buildings, including a new laboratory, were begun that the Bells would name Beinn Bhreagh (Gaelic: Beautiful Mountain) after Bell's ancestral Scottish Highlands. (Note: Under the direction of the Boston architects, Cabot, Everett & Mead, a Nova Scotia company, Rhodes, Curry & Company, carried out the actual construction.) Bell also built the Bell Boatyard on the estate, employing up to 40 people building experimental craft as well as wartime lifeboats and workboats for the Royal Canadian Navy and pleasure craft for the Bell family. He was an enthusiastic boater, and Bell and his family sailed or rowed a long series of vessels on Bras d'Or Lake, ordering additional vessels from the H.W. Embree and Sons boatyard in Port Hawkesbury, Nova Scotia. In his final, and some of his most productive years, Bell split his residency between Washington, D.C., where he and his family initially resided for most of the year, and Beinn Bhreagh, where they spent increasing amounts of time.

Until the end of his life, Bell and his family would alternate between the two homes, but Beinn Bhreagh would, over the next 30 years, become more than a summer home as Bell became so absorbed in his experiments that his annual stays lengthened. Both Mabel and Bell became immersed in the Baddeck community and were accepted by the villagers as "their own". (Note: In one memorable incident, the newly arrived Bells were walking down one of Baddeck's central streets when Bell peered into a storefront window and saw a frustrated shopkeeper fiddling with his problematic telephone. Bell quickly disassembled it and effected a repair, to the owner's amazement. When asked how he was able to do so Bell only needed to introduce himself.) The Bells were still in residence at Beinn Bhreagh when the Halifax Explosion occurred on December 6, 1917. Mabel and Bell mobilized the community to help victims in Halifax.

== Later inventions ==
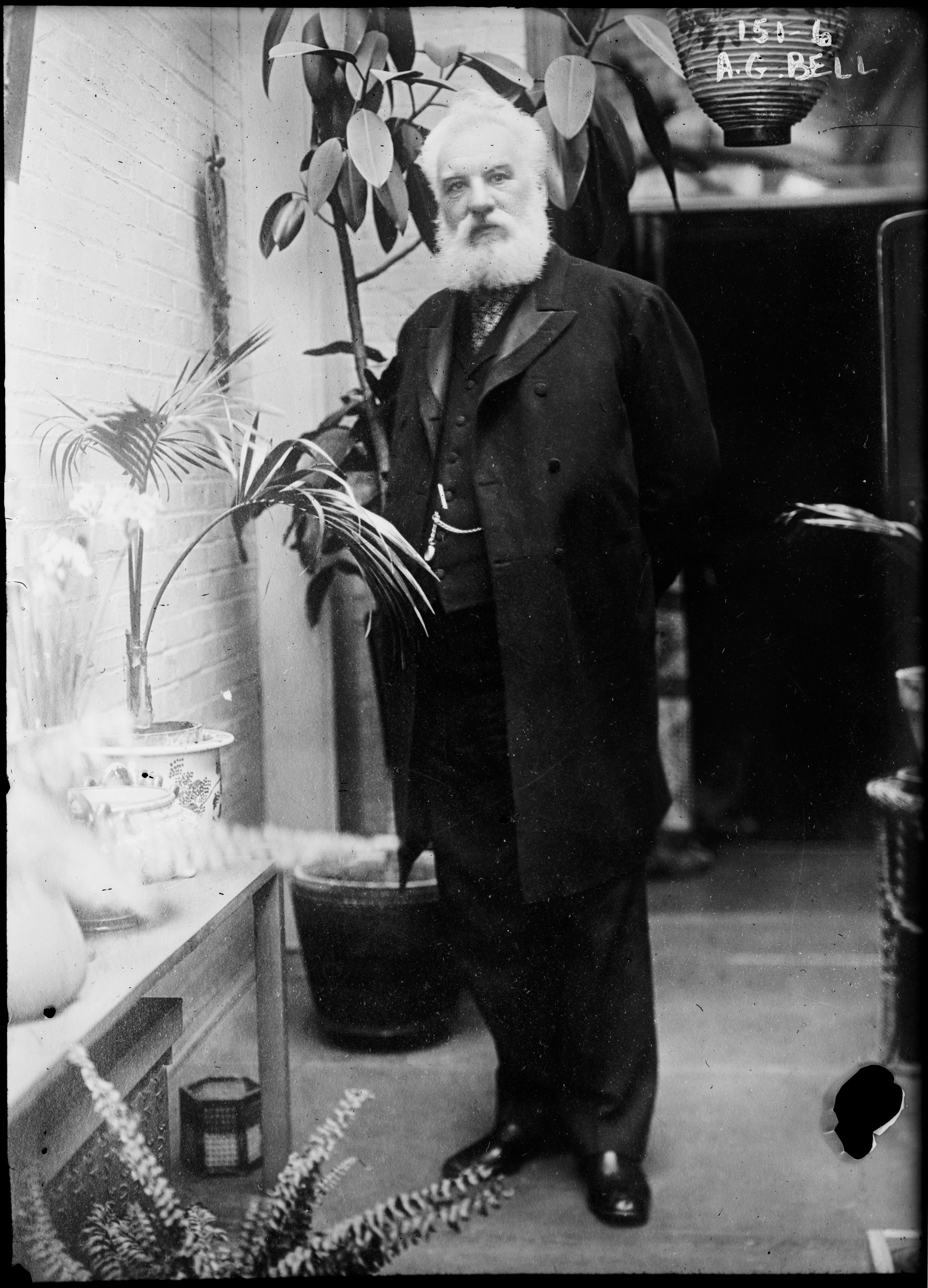
Alexander Graham Bell in his later years

Although Alexander Graham Bell is most often associated with the invention of the telephone, his interests were extremely varied. According to one of his biographers, Charlotte Gray, Bell's work ranged "unfettered across the scientific landscape" and he often went to bed voraciously reading the Encyclopædia Britannica, scouring it for new areas of interest. The range of Bell's inventive genius is represented only in part by the 18 patents granted in his name alone and the 12 he shared with his collaborators. These included 14 for the telephone and telegraph, four for the photophone, one for the phonograph, five for aerial vehicles, four for "hydroairplanes", and two for selenium cells. Bell's inventions spanned a wide range of interests and included a metal jacket to assist in breathing, the audiometer to detect minor hearing problems, a device to locate icebergs, investigations on how to separate salt from seawater, and work on finding alternative fuels.

Bell worked extensively in medical research and invented techniques for teaching speech to the deaf. During his Volta Laboratory period, Bell and his associates considered impressing a magnetic field on a record as a means of reproducing sound. Although the trio briefly experimented with the concept, they could not develop a workable prototype. They abandoned the idea, never realizing they had glimpsed a basic principle which would one day find its application in the tape recorder, the hard disc and floppy disc drive, and other magnetic media.

Bell's own home used a primitive form of air conditioning, in which fans blew currents of air across great blocks of ice. He also anticipated modern concerns with fuel shortages and industrial pollution. Methane gas, he reasoned, could be produced from the waste of farms and factories. At his Canadian estate in Nova Scotia, he experimented with composting toilets and devices to capture water from the atmosphere. In a magazine article published in 1917, he reflected on the possibility of using solar energy to heat houses.

=== Photophone ===
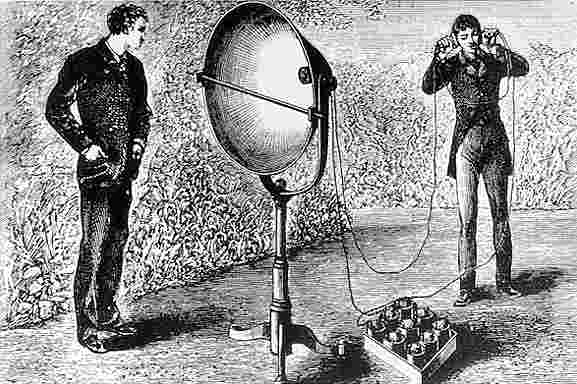
Photophone receiver, one half of Bell's wireless optical communication system, ca. 1880

Bell and his assistant Charles Sumner Tainter jointly invented a wireless telephone, named a photophone, which allowed for the transmission of both sounds and normal human conversations on a beam of light. Both men later became full associates in the Volta Laboratory Association.

On June 21, 1880, Bell's assistant transmitted a wireless voice telephone message a considerable distance, from the roof of the Franklin School in Washington, D.C., to Bell at the window of his laboratory, some 700 feet (213 m) away, 19 years before the first voice radio transmissions.

Bell believed the photophone's principles were his life's "greatest achievement", telling a reporter shortly before his death that the photophone was "the greatest invention [I have] ever made, greater than the telephone". The photophone was a precursor to the fiber-optic communication systems which achieved popular worldwide usage in the 1980s. Its master patent was issued in December 1880, many decades before the photophone's principles came into popular use.

=== Metal detector ===
Bell's voice, from a Volta Laboratory recording in 1885. Restored by the Smithsonian in 2013.

Bell is also credited with developing one of the early versions of a metal detector through the use of an induction balance, after the shooting of U.S. President James A. Garfield in 1881. According to some accounts, the metal detector worked flawlessly in tests but did not find Guiteau's bullet, partly because the metal bed frame on which the President was lying disturbed the instrument, resulting in static. Garfield's surgeons, led by self-appointed chief physician Doctor Willard Bliss, were sceptical of the device, and ignored Bell's requests to move the President to a bed not fitted with metal springs. Alternatively, although Bell had detected a slight sound on his first test, the bullet may have been lodged too deeply to be detected by the crude apparatus.

Bell's own detailed account, presented to the American Association for the Advancement of Science in 1882, differs in several particulars from most of the many and varied versions now in circulation, by concluding that extraneous metal was not to blame for failure to locate the bullet. Perplexed by the peculiar results he had obtained during an examination of Garfield, Bell "proceeded to the Executive Mansion the next morning ... to ascertain from the surgeons whether they were perfectly sure that all metal had been removed from the neighborhood of the bed. It was then recollected that underneath the horse-hair mattress on which the President lay was another mattress composed of steel wires. Upon obtaining a duplicate, the mattress was found to consist of a sort of net of woven steel wires, with large meshes. The extent of the [area that produced a response from the detector] having been so small, as compared with the area of the bed, it seemed reasonable to conclude that the steel mattress had produced no detrimental effect." In a footnote, Bell adds, "The death of President Garfield and the subsequent post-mortem examination, however, proved that the bullet was at too great a distance from the surface to have affected our apparatus."

=== Hydrofoils ===
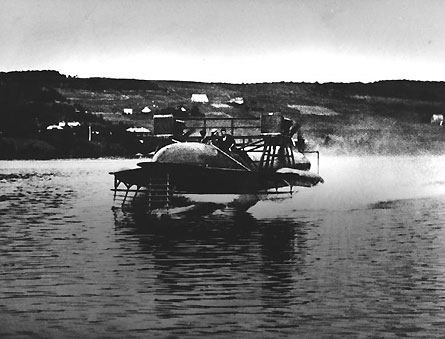
Bell's HD-4 on a test run ca. 1919

The March 1906 Scientific American article by American pioneer William E. Meacham explained the basic principle of hydrofoils and hydroplanes. Bell considered the invention of the hydroplane as a very significant achievement. Based on information gained from that article, he began to sketch concepts of what is now called a hydrofoil boat. Bell and assistant Frederick W. "Casey" Baldwin began hydrofoil experimentation in the summer of 1908 as a possible aid to airplane takeoff from water. Baldwin studied the work of the Italian inventor Enrico Forlanini and began testing models. This led him and Bell to the development of practical hydrofoil watercraft.

During his world tour of 1910–11, Bell and Baldwin met with Forlanini in France. They had rides in the Forlanini hydrofoil boat over Lake Maggiore. Baldwin described it as being as smooth as flying. On returning to Baddeck, a number of initial concepts were built as experimental models, including the Dhonnas Beag (Scottish Gaelic for 'little devil'), the first self-propelled Bell-Baldwin hydrofoil. The experimental boats were essentially proof-of-concept prototypes that culminated in the more substantial HD-4, powered by Renault engines. A top speed of 54 miles per hour (87 km/h) was achieved, with the hydrofoil exhibiting rapid acceleration, good stability, and steering, along with the ability to take waves without difficulty.

In 1913, Dr. Bell hired Walter Pinaud, a Sydney yacht designer and builder as well as the proprietor of Pinaud's Yacht Yard in Westmount, Nova Scotia, to work on the pontoons of the HD-4. Pinaud soon took over the boatyard at Bell Laboratories on Beinn Bhreagh, Bell's estate near Baddeck, Nova Scotia. Pinaud's experience in boatbuilding enabled him to make useful design changes to the HD-4. After the First World War, work began again on the HD-4. Bell's report to the U.S. Navy permitted him to obtain two 350-horsepower (260-kilowatt) engines in July 1919. On September 9, 1919, the HD-4 set a world marine speed record of 70.86 miles per hour (114.04 kilometres per hour), a record which stood for one year.

=== Aeronautics ===
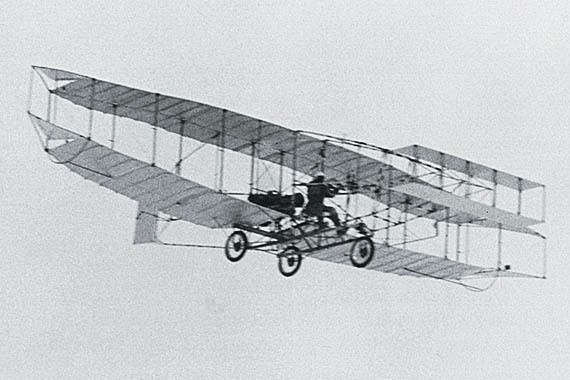
AEA Silver Dart c. 1909

In 1891, Bell had begun experiments to develop motor-powered heavier-than-air aircraft. The AEA was first formed as Bell shared the vision to fly with his wife, who advised him to seek "young" help as Bell was at the age of 60.

In 1898, Bell experimented with tetrahedral box kites and wings constructed of multiple compound tetrahedral kites covered in maroon silk. (Note: Bell was inspired in part by Australian aeronautical engineer Lawrence Hargrave's work with man-carrying box kites. Hargrave declined to take patents on his inventions, similar to Bell's decision not to file patents on some of his inventions. Bell also chose maroon-coloured silk as it would show up clearly against the light-coloured sky in his photographic studies.) The tetrahedral wings were named Cygnet I, II, and III, and were flown both unmanned and manned (Cygnet I crashed during a flight carrying Selfridge) in the period from 1907 to 1912. Some of Bell's kites are on display at the Alexander Graham Bell National Historic Site.

Bell was a supporter of aerospace engineering research through the Aerial Experiment Association (AEA), officially formed at Baddeck, Nova Scotia, in October 1907 at the suggestion of his wife Mabel and with her financial support after the sale of some of her real estate. The AEA was headed by Bell and the founding members were four young men: American Glenn H. Curtiss, a motorcycle manufacturer at the time and who held the title "world's fastest man", having ridden his self-constructed motor bicycle around in the shortest time, and who was later awarded the Scientific American Trophy for the first official one-kilometre flight in the Western Hemisphere, and who later became a world-renowned airplane manufacturer; Lieutenant Thomas Selfridge, an official observer from the U.S. Federal government and one of the few people in the army who believed that aviation was the future; Frederick W. Baldwin, the first Canadian and first British subject to pilot a public flight in Hammondsport, New York; and J. A. D. McCurdy–Baldwin and McCurdy being new engineering graduates from the University of Toronto.

The AEA's work progressed to heavier-than-air machines, applying their knowledge of kites to gliders. Moving to Hammondsport, the group then designed and built the Red Wing, framed in bamboo and covered in red silk and powered by a small air-cooled engine. On March 12, 1908, over Keuka Lake, the biplane lifted off on the first public flight in North America. (Note: "Selfridge Aerodrome Sails Steadily for 319 feet (97 m)." The Washington Post May 13, 1908.) (Note: At 25 to 30 Miles an Hour. First Public Trip of Heavier-than-air Car in America. Professor Alexander Graham Bell's New Machine, Built After Plans by Lieutenant Selfridge, Shown to Be Practicable by Flight Over Keuka Lake. Portion of Tail Gives Way, Bringing the Test to an End. Views of an Expert. Hammondsport, New York, March 12, 1908.) The innovations that were incorporated into this design included a cockpit enclosure and tail rudder (later variations on the original design would add ailerons as a means of control). One of the AEA's inventions, a practical wingtip form of the aileron, was to become a standard component on all aircraft. (Note: The aileron had been conceived of as early as 1868 by British inventor M.P.W. Boulton and was also created independently by Robert Esnault-Pelterie and several others.) The White Wing and June Bug were to follow and by the end of 1908, over 150 flights without mishap had been accomplished. However, the AEA had depleted its initial reserves and only a $15,000 grant from Mrs. Bell allowed it to continue with experiments. Lt. Selfridge had also become the first person killed in a powered heavier-than-air flight in a crash of the Wright Flyer at Fort Myer, Virginia, on September 17, 1908.

Their final aircraft design, the Silver Dart, embodied all of the advancements found in the earlier machines. On February 23, 1909, Bell was present as the Silver Dart flown by J. A. D. McCurdy from the frozen ice of Bras d'Or made the first aircraft flight in Canada. Bell had worried that the flight was too dangerous and had arranged for a doctor to be on hand. With the successful flight, the AEA disbanded and the Silver Dart would revert to Baldwin and McCurdy, who began the Canadian Aerodrome Company and would later demonstrate the aircraft to the Canadian Army.

== Heredity and genetics ==
Bell, along with many members of the scientific community at the time, took an interest in the popular science of heredity which grew out of the publication of Charles Darwin's book On the Origin of Species in 1859. On his estate in Nova Scotia, Bell conducted meticulously recorded breeding experiments with rams and ewes. Over the course of more than 30 years, Bell sought to produce a breed of sheep with multiple nipples that would bear twins. He specifically wanted to see if selective breeding could produce sheep with four functional nipples with enough milk for twin lambs. This interest in animal breeding caught the attention of scientists focused on the study of heredity and genetics in humans.

In November 1883, Bell presented a paper at a meeting of the National Academy of Sciences titled Upon the Formation of a Deaf Variety of the Human Race. The paper is a compilation of data on the hereditary aspects of deafness. Bell's research indicated that a hereditary tendency toward deafness, as indicated by the possession of deaf relatives, was an important element in determining the production of deaf offspring. He noted that the proportion of deaf children born to deaf parents was many times greater than the proportion of deaf children born to the general population. In the paper, Bell delved into social commentary and discussed hypothetical public policies to bring an end to deafness. He also criticized educational practices that segregated deaf children rather than integrating them fully into mainstream classrooms. The paper did not propose sterilization of deaf people or prohibition on intermarriage, noting that "We cannot dictate to men and women whom they should marry and natural selection no longer influences mankind to any great extent." Bell concludes the paper by stating:

“If the laws of heredity that are known to hold in the case of animals also apply to man, the intermarriage of deaf-mutes through a number of successive generations should result in the formation of a deaf variety of the human race.

On the other hand, if it can be shown that congenitally deaf persons marry one another without any greater liability to the production of deaf offspring than is to be found among the people at larger, then it will be evident that we cannot safely apply to man the deductions that have been drawn from experiments upon animals.”

A review of Bell's Memoir upon the Formation of a Deaf Variety of the Human Race appearing in an 1885 issue of the American Annals of the Deaf and Dumb states that "Dr. Bell does not advocate legislative interference with the marriages of the deaf for several reasons one of which is that the results of such marriages have not yet been sufficiently investigated." The article goes on to say that "the editorial remarks based thereon did injustice to the author." The paper's author concludes by saying "A wiser way to prevent the extension of hereditary deafness, it seems to us, would be to continue the investigations which Dr. Bell has so admirable begun until the laws of the transmission of the tendency to deafness are fully understood, and then by explaining those laws to the pupils of our schools to lead them to choose their partners in marriage in such a way that deaf-mute offspring will not be the result."

Historians have noted that Bell explicitly opposed laws regulating marriage, and never mentioned sterilization in any of his writings. Even after Bell agreed to engage with scientists conducting eugenic research, he consistently refused to support public policy that limited the rights or privileges of the deaf.

Bell's interest and research on heredity attracted the interest of Charles Davenport, a Harvard professor and head of the Cold Spring Harbor Laboratory. In 1906, Davenport, who was also the founder of the American Breeder's Association, approached Bell about joining a new committee on eugenics chaired by David Starr Jordan. In 1910, Davenport opened the Eugenics Records office at Cold Spring Harbor. To give the organization scientific credibility, Davenport set up a Board of Scientific Directors naming Bell as chairman. Other members of the board included Luther Burbank, Roswell H. Johnson, Vernon L. Kellogg, and William E. Castle.

In 1921, a Second International Congress of Eugenics was held in New York at the Museum of Natural History and chaired by Davenport. Although Bell did not present any research or speak as part of the proceedings, he was named as honorary president as a means to attract other scientists to attend the event. A summary of the event notes that Bell was a "pioneering investigator in the field of human heredity".

== Death ==
Bell died of complications arising from diabetes on August 2, 1922, at his private estate in Cape Breton, Nova Scotia, at age 75. Bell had also been affected by pernicious anemia. His last view of the land he had inhabited was by moonlight on his mountain estate at 2:00 a.m. (Note: In the last years of his life, as his final projects wound down, Bell and his wife, their extended family and friends, lived exclusively at their beloved Beinn Bhreagh.) (Note: From Bethune (2009), p. 119: "[his end came] at 2:00 am... His wife, Mabel, daughter Daisy, and son-in-law David Fairchild had gathered around him. His last view was of the moon rising above the mountain he loved".) While tending to him after his long illness, Mabel, his wife, whispered, "Don't leave me." By way of reply, Bell signed "no...", lost consciousness, and died shortly after.

On learning of Bell's death, the Canadian Prime Minister, Mackenzie King, cabled Mrs. Bell, saying:

My colleagues in the Government join with me in expressing to you our sense of the world's loss in the death of your distinguished husband. It will ever be a source of pride to our country that the great invention, with which his name is immortally associated, is a part of its history. On the behalf of the citizens of Canada, may I extend to you an expression of our combined gratitude and sympathy.

Bell's coffin was constructed of Beinn Bhreagh pine by his laboratory staff, lined with the same red silk fabric used in his tetrahedral kite experiments. To help celebrate his life, his wife asked guests not to wear black (the traditional funeral colour) while attending his service, during which soloist Jean MacDonald sang a verse of Robert Louis Stevenson's "Requiem":

Under a wide and starry sky,
Dig the grave and let me lie.
Glad did I live and gladly die
And I laid me down with a will.

Upon the conclusion of Bell's funeral, for one minute at 6:25 p.m. Eastern Time, "every phone on the continent of North America was silenced in honor of the man who had given to mankind the means for direct communication at a distance".

Alexander Graham Bell was buried atop Beinn Bhreagh mountain, on his estate where he had resided increasingly for the last 35 years of his life, overlooking Bras d'Or Lake. He was survived by his wife Mabel, his two daughters, Elsie May and Marian, and nine of his grandchildren.

== Legacy and honours ==
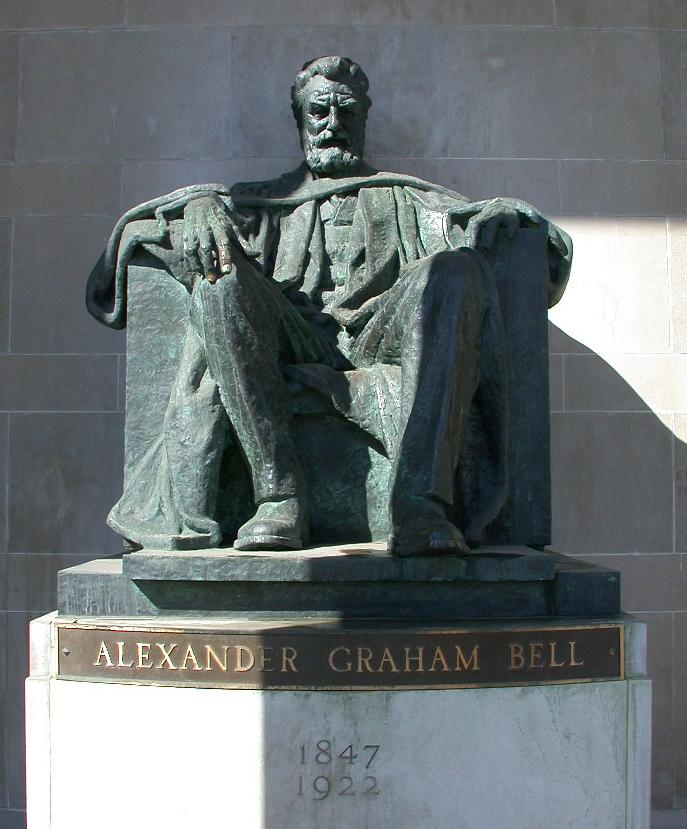
Bell statue by A. E. Cleeve Horne in front of the Bell Telephone Building of Brantford, Ontario, The Telephone City (Note: The Charles Fleetford Sise Chapter of the Telephone Pioneers of America commissioned and dedicated the large bronze statue of Bell in the front portico of Brantford, Ontario's new Bell Telephone Building plant on June 17, 1949. Attending the formal ceremony were Bell's daughter, Mrs. Gillbert Grosvenor, Frederick Johnson, President of the Bell Telephone Company of Canada, T.N. Lacy, President of the Telephone Pioneers, and Brantford Mayor Walter J. Dowden. To each side of the portico facing the monument are the engraved inscriptions "In Grateful Recognition of the Inventor of the Telephone". Its dedication was broadcast live nationally by the Canadian Broadcasting Corporation.) (Brantford Heritage Inventory, City of Brantford)

Honours and tributes flowed to Bell in increasing numbers as his invention became ubiquitous and his personal fame grew. Bell received numerous honorary degrees from colleges and universities to the point that the requests almost became burdensome. During his life, he also received dozens of major awards, medals, and other tributes. These included statuary monuments to both him and the new form of communication his telephone created, including the Bell Telephone Memorial erected in his honour in Alexander Graham Bell Gardens in Brantford, Ontario, in 1917.

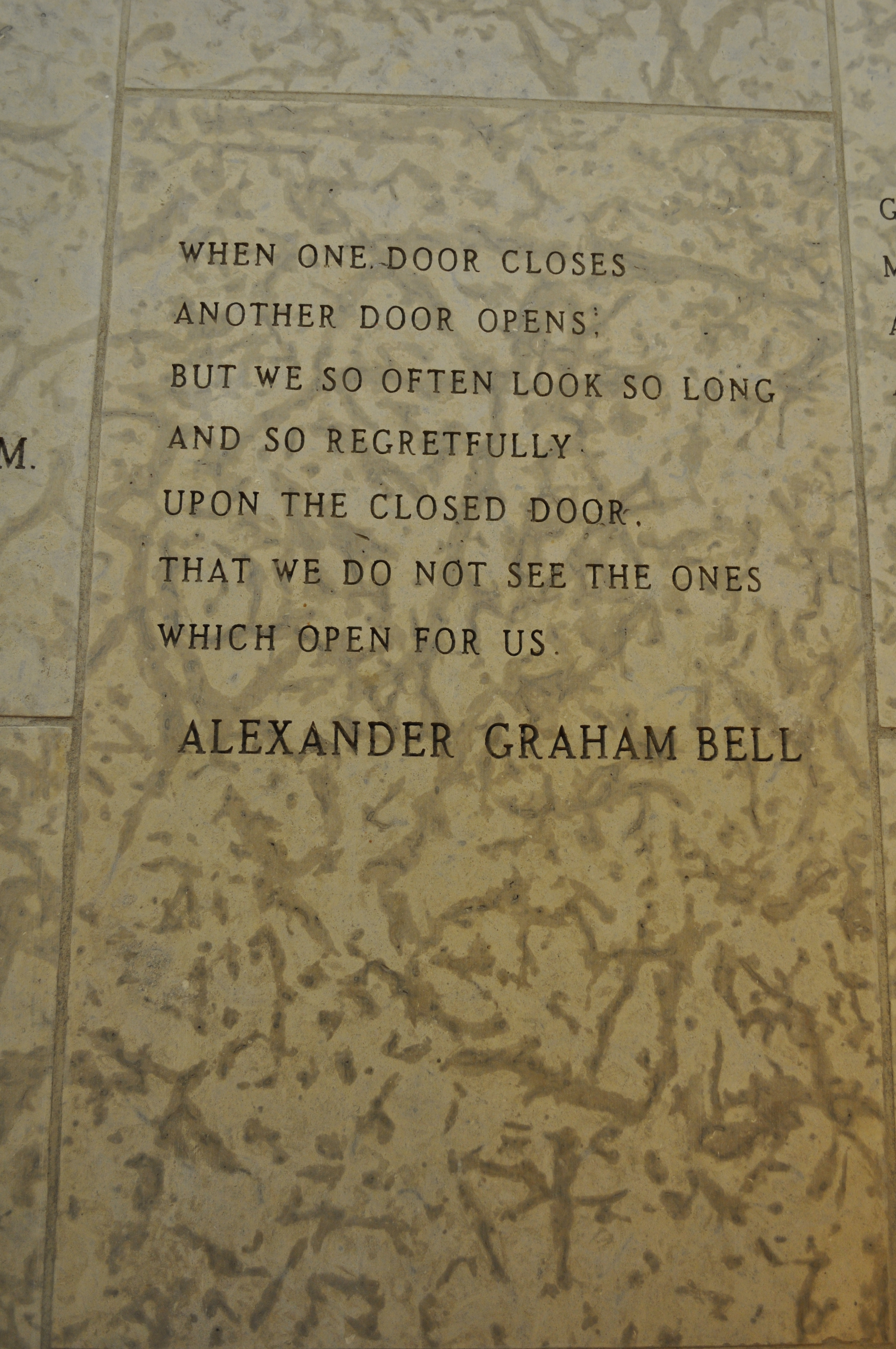
A quote by Alexander Graham Bell engraved in the stone wall within the Peace Chapel of the International Peace Garden (in Manitoba Canada and North Dakota, USA)

A large number of Bell's writings, personal correspondence, notebooks, papers, and other documents reside in both the United States Library of Congress Manuscript Division (as the Alexander Graham Bell Family Papers), and at the Alexander Graham Bell Institute, Cape Breton University, Nova Scotia; major portions of which are available for online viewing.

A number of historic sites and other marks commemorate Bell in North America and Europe, including the first telephone companies in the United States and Canada. Among the major sites are:

- The Alexander Graham Bell National Historic Site, maintained by Parks Canada, which incorporates the Alexander Graham Bell Museum, in Baddeck, Nova Scotia, close to the Bell estate Beinn Bhreagh;
- The Bell Homestead National Historic Site, includes the Bell family home, "Melville House", and farm overlooking Brantford, Ontario and the Grand River. It was their first home in North America;
- Canada's first telephone company building, the "Henderson Home" of the late 1870s, a predecessor of the Bell Telephone Company of Canada (officially chartered in 1880). In 1969, the building was carefully moved to the historic Bell Homestead National Historic Site in Brantford, Ontario, and was refurbished to become a telephone museum. The Bell Homestead, the Henderson Home telephone museum, and the National Historic Site's reception centre are all maintained by the Bell Homestead Society;
- The Alexander Graham Bell Memorial Park, which features a broad neoclassical monument built in 1917 by public subscription. The monument depicts mankind's ability to span the globe through telecommunications;
- The Alexander Graham Bell Museum (opened in 1956), part of the Alexander Graham Bell National Historic Site which was completed in 1978 in Baddeck, Nova Scotia. Many of the museum's artifacts were donated by Bell's daughters.
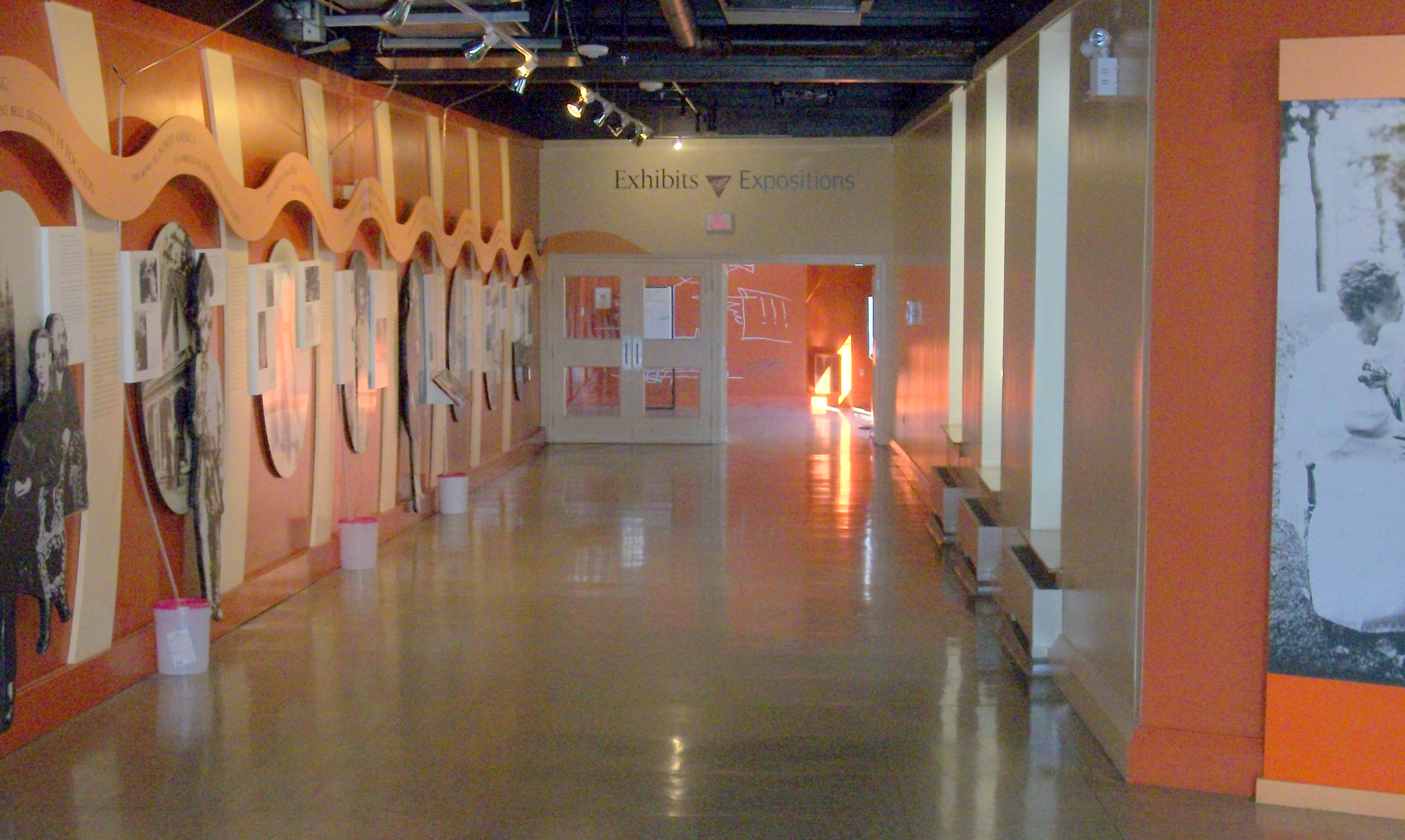
  The Bell Museum, Cape Breton, part of the Alexander Graham Bell National Historic Site

In 1880, Bell received the Volta Prize with a purse of 50,000 French francs (approximately US$350,000 in today's currency) for the invention of the telephone from the French government. Among the luminaries who judged were Victor Hugo and Alexandre Dumas. The Volta Prize was conceived by Napoleon III in 1852, and named in honour of Alessandro Volta, with Bell becoming the second recipient of the grand prize in its history. Since Bell was becoming increasingly affluent, he used his prize money to create endowment funds (the 'Volta Fund') and institutions in and around Washington, D.C., the capital of the United States, including the Volta Laboratory Association (1880), also known as Volta Laboratory and as the Alexander Graham Bell Laboratory, which eventually led to the Volta Bureau (1887), a centre for studies on deafness, which remains in operation in the Georgetown neighborhood of Washington, D.C.

The Volta Laboratory became an experimental facility devoted to scientific discovery, and the very next year it improved Edison's phonograph by substituting wax for tinfoil as the recording medium and incising the recording rather than indenting it, key upgrades that Edison himself later adopted. The laboratory was also the site where he and his associate invented his "proudest achievement", "the photophone", the "optical telephone" which presaged fibre optical telecommunications while the Volta Bureau would later evolve into the Alexander Graham Bell Association for the Deaf and Hard of Hearing (the AG Bell), a centre for the research and pedagogy of deafness.

In partnership with Gardiner Greene Hubbard, Bell helped establish the publication Science during the early 1880s. In 1898, Bell was elected as the second president of the National Geographic Society, serving until 1903, and was primarily responsible for the extensive use of illustrations, including photography, in the magazine. He also served for many years as a Regent of the Smithsonian Institution (1898–1922). The French government conferred on him the decoration of the Légion d'honneur (Legion of Honour); the Royal Society of Arts in London awarded him the Albert Medal in 1902; the University of Würzburg, Bavaria, granted him a PhD, and he was awarded the Franklin Institute's Elliott Cresson Medal in 1912. He was one of the founders of the American Institute of Electrical Engineers in 1884 and served as its president from 1891 to 1892. Bell was later awarded the AIEE's Edison Medal in 1914 "For meritorious achievement in the invention of the telephone".

The bel (B) and the smaller decibel (dB) are units of measurement of sound pressure level (SPL) invented by Bell Labs and named after him. (Note: The decibel is defined as one tenth of a bel.) Since 1976, the IEEE's Alexander Graham Bell Medal has been awarded to honour outstanding contributions in the field of telecommunications.

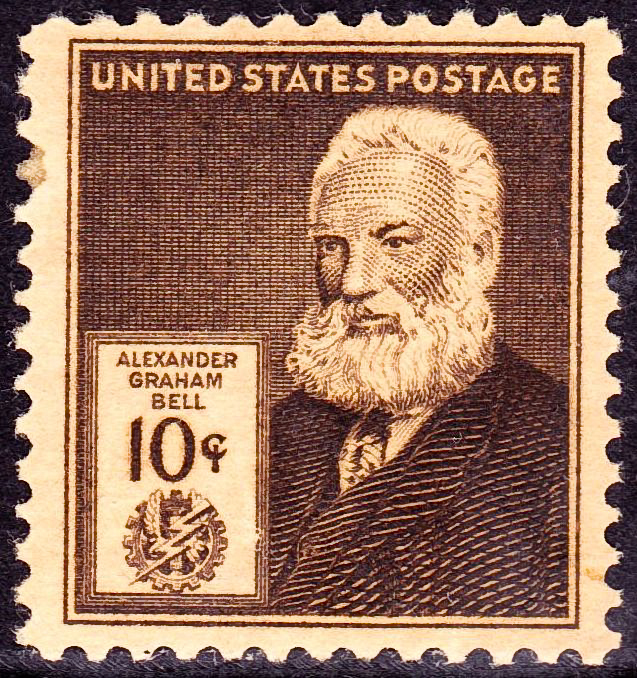
A.G. Bell issue of 1940

In 1936, the US Patent Office declared Bell first on its list of the country's greatest inventors, leading to the US Post Office issuing a commemorative stamp honouring Bell in 1940 as part of its 'Famous Americans Series'. The First Day of Issue ceremony was held on October 28 in Boston, Massachusetts, the city where Bell spent considerable time on research and working with the deaf. The Bell stamp became very popular and sold out in little time. The stamp became, and remains to this day, the most valuable one of the series.

The 150th anniversary of Bell's birth in 1997 was marked by a special issue of commemorative £1 banknotes from the Royal Bank of Scotland. The illustrations on the reverse of the note include Bell's face in profile, his signature, and objects from Bell's life and career: users of the telephone over the ages; an audio wave signal; a diagram of a telephone receiver; geometric shapes from engineering structures; representations of sign language and the phonetic alphabet; the geese which helped him to understand flight; and the sheep which he studied to understand genetics. Additionally, the Government of Canada honoured Bell in 1997 with a C$100 gold coin, in tribute also to the 150th anniversary of his birth, and with a silver dollar coin in 2009 in honour of the 100th anniversary of flight in Canada. That first flight was made by an airplane designed under Dr. Bell's tutelage, named the Silver Dart. Bell's image, and also those of his many inventions have graced paper money, coinage, and postal stamps in numerous countries worldwide for many dozens of years.

Alexander Graham Bell was ranked 57th among the 100 Greatest Britons (2002) in an official BBC nationwide poll, and among the Top Ten Greatest Canadians (2004), and the 100 Greatest Americans (2005). In 2006, Bell was also named as one of the 10 greatest Scottish scientists in history after having been listed in the National Library of Scotland's 'Scottish Science Hall of Fame'. Bell's name is still widely known and used as part of the names of dozens of educational institutes, corporate namesakes, street and place names around the world.

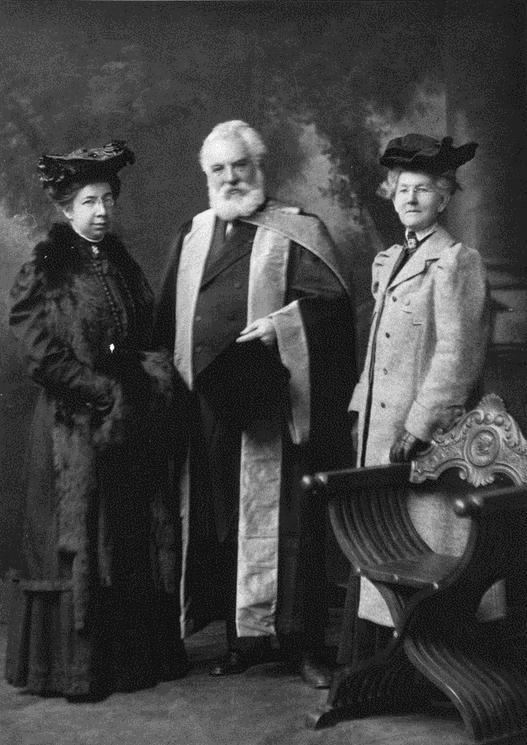
Bell, an alumnus of the University of Edinburgh, Scotland, receiving an honorary Doctor of Laws degree (LL.D.) at the university in 1906

=== Honorary degrees ===
Alexander Graham Bell, who could not complete the university program of his youth, received at least a dozen honorary degrees from academic institutions, including eight honorary LL.D.s (Doctorate of Law), two Ph.D.s, a D.Sc., and an M.D.:

- Gallaudet College (then named National Deaf-Mute College) in Washington, D.C. (Ph.D.) in 1880
- University of Würzburg in Würzburg, Bavaria (Ph.D.) in 1882
- Heidelberg University in Heidelberg, Germany (M.D.) in 1886
- Harvard University in Cambridge, Massachusetts (LL.D.) in 1896
- Illinois College, in Jacksonville, Illinois (LL.D.) in 1896, possibly 1881
- Amherst College in Amherst, Massachusetts (LL.D.) in 1901
- University of St Andrews in St Andrews, Scotland (LL.D) in 1902
- University of Oxford in Oxford, England (D.Sc.) in 1906
- University of Edinburgh in Edinburgh, Scotland (LL.D.) in 1906
- The George Washington University in Washington, D.C. (LL.D.) in 1913
- Queen's University at Kingston in Kingston, Ontario, Canada (LL.D.) in 1908
- Dartmouth College in Hanover, New Hampshire (LL.D.) in 1913, possibly 1914

== Portrayal in film, television and fiction ==
- The 1939 film The Story of Alexander Graham Bell was based on his life and works.
- Eyewitness No. 90 A Great Inventor Is Remembered, a 1957 NFB short about Bell.
- The 1965 BBC miniseries Alexander Graham Bell starring Alec McCowen and Francesca Annis.
- The 1992 film The Sound and the Silence was a TV film.
- Biography aired an episode Alexander Graham Bell: Voice of Invention on August 6, 1996.
- John Tench portrays Bell five times in the Canadian television period detective series Murdoch Mysteries. Bell appeared in "Invention Convention" (April 24, 2012), "Murdoch in Toyland" (May 8, 2012), "8 Footsteps" (October 9, 2017), "Staring Blindly into the Future" (January 13, 2020) and "Murdoch and the Sonic Boom" (October 24, 2022).
- A Sign of Her Own, by Sarah Marsh (2024), a novel about a pupil of Bell's Visible Speech, who is "gradually realising and acting upon the harm he was inflicting on her and other deaf people."

== Bibliography ==
- Bell, Alexander Graham (October 1880). "On the Production and Reproduction of Sound by Light". American Journal of Science (Read before the American Association for the Advancement of Science, in Boston, August 27, 1880). Third. 20 (118): 305–324. Bibcode:1880AmJS...20..305B. doi:10.2475/ajs.s3-20.118.305. S2CID 130048089.
  Also published as: Bell, Alexander Graham (September 23, 1880). "Selenium and the Photophone". Nature. 22 (569): 500–503. Bibcode:1880Natur..22..500.. doi:10.1038/022500a0.
- Bell, Alexander Graham (1898). The Question of Sign-Language and The Utility of Signs in the Instruction of the Deaf—Two papers (PDF). Washington, D.C.: Sanders Printing Office. Archived from the original (PDF) on October 29, 2012.
- Bell, Alexander Graham (February 1917). "Prizes for the Inventor: Some of the Problems Awaiting Solution". The National Geographic Magazine. Vol. 31, no. 2. National Geographic Society. pp. 131–146.

== See also ==
- Alexander Graham Bell Association for the Deaf and Hard of Hearing
- Alexander Graham Bell National Historic Site
- Bell Boatyard
- Bell Homestead National Historic Site
- Bell Telephone Memorial
- Berliner, Emile
- Bourseul, Charles
- IEEE Alexander Graham Bell Medal
- Manzetti, Innocenzo
- Meucci, Antonio
- Oriental Telephone Company
- People on Scottish banknotes
- Pioneers, a Volunteer Network
- Reis, Philipp
- The Story of Alexander Graham Bell, a 1939 movie of his life
- The Telephone Cases
- Volta Laboratory and Bureau

== Notes ==
Non-profit organization positions
Preceded by Gardiner Greene Hubbard	President of the National Geographic Society; 1897–1904	Succeeded by William John McGee
