= Beep baseball =

Sport for visually impaired people

Beep baseball is a form of baseball which can be played by people who are visually impaired, using a ball that beeps.

== National Beep Baseball Association ==
The National Beep Baseball Association (NBBA) was organized in the United States in 1976 for adults with visual impairments to play baseball. Each year, the NBBA coordinates local, state, and regional tournaments, among them the Indy Invitational in Indianapolis, Indiana; the Bolingbrook Beep Ball Bash (one of the first tournaments to offer a cash award) outside Chicago, Illinois; in some cases, a round robin tournament in Columbus, Ohio; and, more recently, a round robin tournament in the Philadelphia area. In August of each year, the NBBA sponsors a national and international invitational tournament. The 2007 World Series, as the August invitational is known, was held for the first time in a city that hosts no beep baseball team, Rochester, Minnesota. More recently, the World Series has been held in Columbus, Ohio, in 2004; Houston, Texas, in 2005; and Cleveland, Ohio, in 2006. The World Series was held in Taiwan in 2000.

The 2018 World Series took place in Eau Claire, Wisconsin, and the 2019 event took place in Tulsa, Oklahoma.

== Outside the United States ==
Beep baseball is said to have a "strong following" in France, Germany and Italy, and a taster event was organised at Farnham Park, England, in 2013 by BaseballSoftballUK.

== Basic rules ==
=== Setup and equipment ===
Beep baseball is played on a grass field with six fielders (generally a first-baseman, third-baseman, shortstop, left fielder, right fielder, and center fielder, although two-four defensive sets are not unheard-of) and one or two "spotters" from one team, and the pitcher, catcher, and batter from the other team. Fielders and batter are blindfolded. There is also a D.H. and D.F. (designated fielder). They must be legally blind, in most cases. However, the NBBA has a rule that, if a team cannot field the minimum six batters required to fill its lineup card, it may opt to allow up to two sighted volunteers to blindfold themselves and play as the players with visual impairments do. Catcher, pitcher, and spotters do not wear blindfolds and are usually sighted, although there have been a few who are partially blind. The ball beeps and is a modified, oversized softball. The bases are blue, nearly 5 ft (1.5 m) tall, and have mostly foam interior with electronics that cause it to buzz steadily when a switch is thrown. They are each placed 100 ft (30 m) from homeplate and are in the equivalent positions to first and third bases in regular baseball.

=== Run scoring ===
When the batter hits the ball, a base operator turns on one of the two bases (first or third) for the batter to run to. If the batter touches the base before a fielder can pick up the ball, the offensive team scores a run. It takes four strikes for a batter to be out. If the ball goes beyond the two base lines or doesn't travel at least 40 ft (12 m), it is foul and counted as a strike, unless it is the potential fourth strike, in which case the count holds and the batter just swings again. If a batted ball travels at least 170 ft (52 m) in the air over fair territory before settling, it is, upon declaration of the umpire, a home run. If the ball ceases to beep, or if it hits the pitcher, and becomes a "dead ball," the count is reset and the batter swings again. A dead ball must not be touched. If it is, it is said to be back in play and the out must be recorded.

=== Spotting ===
The spotter or spotters call out a number to signify which part of the field a ball is traveling toward. Generally, the middle of the outfield is labeled 6, and either side, left and right, is numbered from 1 to 5 in a mirroring pattern. The spotter must not say anything beyond the numbered region on the field, and two spotters cannot make a call on the same play. If either case occurs, the run scores. The fielders head toward that section and listen for where the ball is specifically, often diving to the ground to get it. When a fielder picks up the ball before the batter reaches the base, the batter is out. In the rare event that a fielder catches the ball in the air before it touches the ground or other items, the side is automatically retired and the next half-inning commences. The spotter must also watch to ensure that nobody collides.

=== Innings ===
Beep baseball generally has six innings. The extra innings rules used in Major League Baseball generally apply to beep baseball. If one team is up by twelve or more runs, the other team has the opportunity to have short innings in which the losing team bats every inning and the winning team fields. This is known as the twelve-run rule; when it occurs, one team is said to "twelve-run" another. If the other team makes up the difference, the team that had been winning gets back all their missed at-bats.

There are no age- or gender-based restrictions in beep baseball; people as old as 70 and as young as 12 have played.

== Teams ==
Several teams (over 200 teams, example of close to 50 since 2008, both past and present, some renamed) are:

- Arizona Sidewinders (Chandler, Arizona)
- Atlanta Eclipse
- Athens Timberwolves
- Augusta Hammers
- Austin Blackhawks
- Austin Jr. Hawks
- Bay Area Microchips (San Jose, California)
- Bayou City Heat (Houston, Texas)
- BCS Outlaws (Bryan/College Station, Texas)
- Boston Renegades
- Braille Bandits of Palm Beach County (West Palm Beach, Florida)
- Caribbean Hurricanes
- Chicago Comets
- Cleveland Scrappers
- Colorado Storm (Boulder, Colorado)
- Columbus Midnight Stars
- Columbus Vipers
- Daytona Bats
- Florida Flamingoes (Orlando, Florida)
- Indianapolis Thunder
- Iowa Reapers (Ames, Iowa)
- Kansas All-Stars (Kansas City, Kansas)
- Lone Star Roadrunners (Fort Worth, Texas)
- Long Island Bombers (Rockville Center/Farmingdale, New York)
- Los Angeles Bats
- Las Vegas 20/20
- SMURF AND BANKS (Bloomington, Minnesota)
- Minnesota Millers
- New Jersey Lightning
- New Jersey Titans
- New York Heroes (Colonie, New York)
- Oklahoma City Bombers
- Pennsylvania Wolfpack (Philadelphia, Pennsylvania)
- Philly Fire
- Providence Power
- Rochester Pioneers (formerly Rochester Redwings) (Rochester, New York)
- San Antonio Jets (San Antonio, Texas)
- St. Louis Firing Squad
- Seattle South King Sluggers
- Southern Cal. Guardians (Claremont, California)
- Southwest Slammers (Tucson, Arizona)
- Sports for the Blind Lion Pride (Spokane, Washington)
- Stockton Sting Rays
- Tacoma Tide
- Taiwan Homerun (Irvine, California)
- Toronto Blind Jays
- U.S.A. Legends
- Tyler Tigers
- West Coast Dawgs (Fresno, California)
- Wichita Falcons (formerly Wichita Sonics)

== See also ==
- Goalball
- Paralympic Games
