= You Know My Name (film) =

1999 TV film

- VHS cover
- Genre: Western
- Written by: John Kent Harrison
- Directed by: John Kent Harrison
- Starring: Sam Elliott; Arliss Howard
- Music by: Lawrence Shragge
- Country of origin: United States
- Original language: English

Production
- Executive producers: Amy Adelson; Brandon Stoddard; Sam Elliott
- Producer: Andrew Gottlieb
- Cinematography: Kees Van Oostrum
- Editor: Lois Freeman-Fox
- Running time: 94 minutes
- Production company: Ancient Mariner Films

Original release
- Network: TNT
- Release: August 22, 1999

You Know My Name is a 1999 American Western television film written and directed by John Kent Harrison and starring Sam Elliott and Arliss Howard, with Carolyn McCormick, R. Lee Ermey, James Gammon, and James Parks in supporting roles. Its plot is based on the real-life story of lawman and gunslinger Bill Tilghman, who also directed and produced the 1915 Western film The Passing of the Oklahoma Outlaws. It aired on TNT on August 22, 1999.

== Plot ==
It is 1924, at the height of Prohibition. Oklahoma is still a wild and lawless haven for all manner of criminals, and even the men who are sworn to uphold the law are themselves corrupt and part of the new crime syndicates looking to expand into the new markets and towns. One of these men is Wiley Lynn, an unscrupulous federal agent who hides behind the power his badge gives him and ruthlessly deals with anyone who stands in his way, even his own wife. His drinking and drug addiction further feed his increasingly violent and erratic behavior.

Bill Tilghman is a former lawman known for his marksmanship and past partnership with Wyatt Earp. After retiring from law enforcement and settling in Chandler, Oklahoma with his wife Zoe and their two young sons, Tilghman decides to direct and star in a movie about his time on the frontier. Concerned by the growing popularity of movies that romanticize the past, he sets out to produce a movie that offers a more realistic portrayal of outlaw life.

Fed up with the growing and indiscriminate violence and chaos in their town, the people of Cromwell reluctantly turn to Tilghman to help restore order and kick out the criminal element. Although he is faced with several corrupt business owners who frequently attempt to thwart his efforts, Tilghman quickly wins over the more intimidated or skeptical townsfolk with his honesty, wit and fair dealing. They gradually become more assertive and willing to take a more active role in directly dealing with the gamblers, swindlers, murderers, and prostitutes. Before long, Cromwell becomes a quiet and genteel town.

The new order does not sit well with Lynn, who dismisses Tilghman as a relic whose time has long passed. Having previously murdered three other men in cold blood, Lynn sets his sights on Tilghman.

== Cast ==
Per Movies Made for Television.

- Sam Elliott as Bill Tilghman
- Arliss Howard as Wiley Lynn
- Carolyn McCormick as Zoe
- James Gammon as Real Tom "Arkansas Tom"
- Walter Olkewicz as Mr. Killian
- Wendell Smith as False Arkansas Tom
- R. Lee Ermey as Marshal Nix
- James Parks as Joe "Alibi Joe"
- Zachary Contos as Wiley's Baby

== Production ==
Filming took place in Alberta, Canada.

== See also ==
- American Old West
- Bat Masterson
