= Mabel H. Grosvenor =

American pediatrician

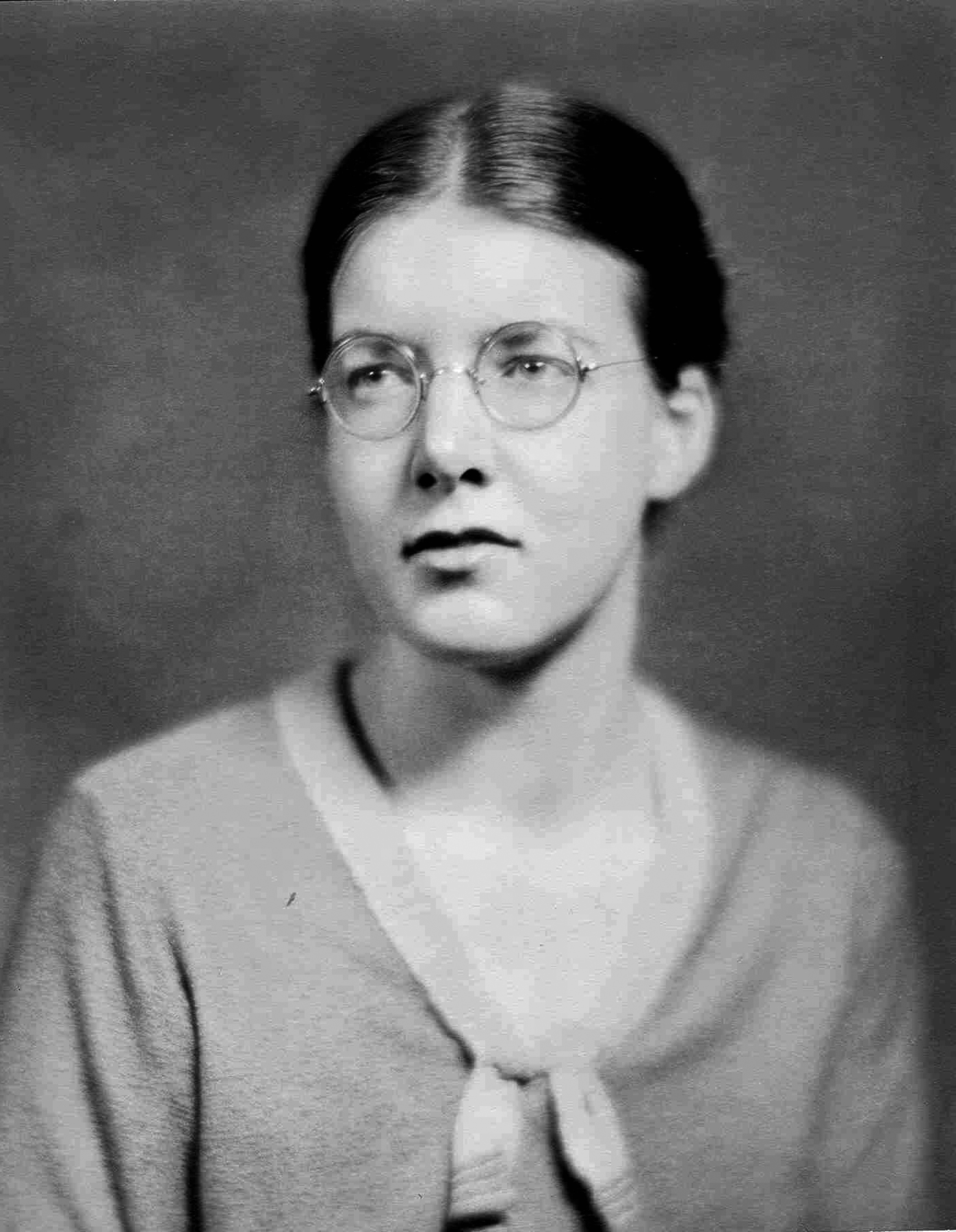
- Mabel Harlakenden Grosvenor (1931)
- Born: July 28, 1905; Beinn Bhreagh, Nova Scotia
- Died: October 30, 2006 (aged 101); Baddeck, Nova Scotia
- Parent: Gilbert Hovey Grosvenor (Father) Elsie May Bell (Mother)
- Relatives: Gardiner Greene Hubbard (great-grandfather); Mabel Bell (grandmother)

Mabel Harlakenden Grosvenor (July 28, 1905 – October 30, 2006) was a Canadian-born American pediatrician. She was a granddaughter and secretary to the scientist and telephone pioneer Alexander Graham Bell. She lived in both Beinn Bhreagh, Nova Scotia and Washington, D.C.

Grosvenor oversaw the stewardship of Bell's legacy Canadian estate at Beinn Bhreagh, Baddeck, Nova Scotia, until her death, and was also the Honorary President of the Alexander Graham Bell Club (founded in 1891), Canada's oldest continuing women's club. The club grew out of a social organization started at Beinn Bhreagh, by Mabel Bell, Alexander's wife.

When Grosvenor died in 2006, at age 101, she was likely the last surviving individual to have personally known and worked with Alexander Graham Bell.

== Biography ==
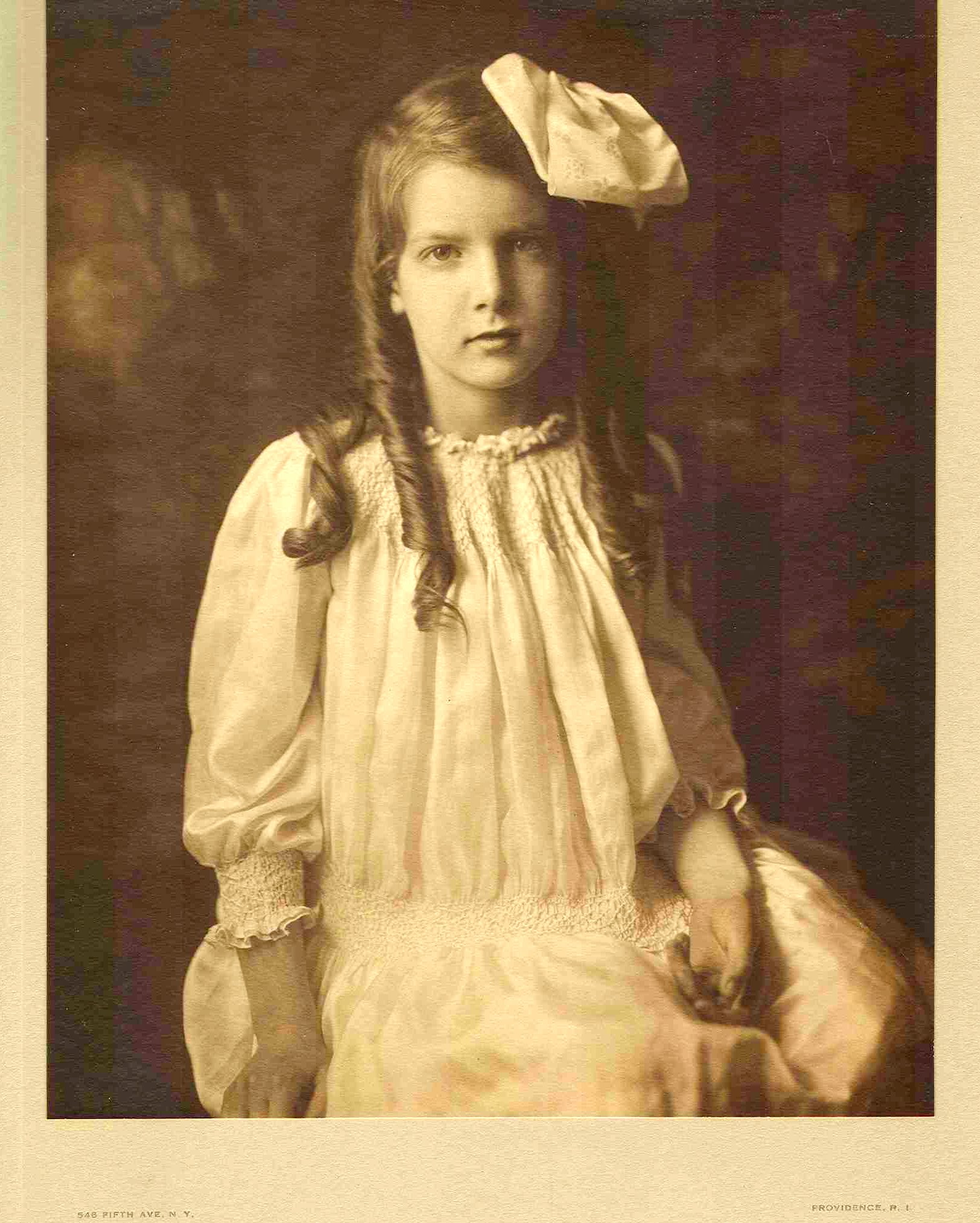
Mabel Grosvenor in 1912 at age 7

=== Early life ===
Grosvenor was the third of seven children born to Gilbert Hovey Grosvenor (1875–1966), the father of photojournalism, and the first full-time editor of National Geographic Magazine, and to Elsie May Bell (1878–1964), the first child born to Alexander Graham Bell and Mabel Gardiner Hubbard. Grosvenor was named after her maternal grandmother, Mabel, who was struck with deafness at age five and became, apocryphally, the reason for the invention of the telephone by Mabel's fiancée.

She lived and grew up in both the Beinn Bhreagh estate where she was born, as well as her parents' home near Dupont Circle in Washington, D.C. In 1912, her parents moved to a large farm in North Bethesda, Maryland, at what later became the Grosvenor Metro station.

=== Education ===
Grosvenor was described as intelligent, modest and optimistic, and became one of the first female graduates of the Johns Hopkins University medical program in Baltimore, Maryland. She had earlier studied at Mount Holyoke College in Massachusetts, a liberal arts college for women and one of the oldest of the elite "Seven Sisters" universities in the United States. She graduated from Mount Holyoke Phi Beta Kappa in 1927 and completed her medical degree in 1931. She then became a pediatrician and worked with disadvantaged children in Washington, D.C.'s Children's Hospital, retiring after 35 years of service.

=== Personal life ===
Grosvenor never married, had no children, but became the unofficial matriarch to about 60 nieces and nephews of several generations of Bell descendants at Beinn Bhreagh, Baddeck, Nova Scotia. 'Aunty Mabel', as she was known to her extended kin at the estate, was seen as an important part of the "leadership in the family" at both the Canadian estate and in the U.S. capitol. To the Baddeck community, she was known simply as 'Dr. Mabel'.

=== Death ===
In her later years she suffered from congestive heart failure but decided to stay on at the Bell estate due to her close relationship with the people of the community. She died aged 101, of respiratory failure on October 30, 2006, at the Bell estate near Baddeck. A funeral service was held for her on November 4, 2006, at Greenwood United Church in Baddeck, and a memorial service was held for her shortly afterwards in Washington, D.C.

== Witness to inventions, discoveries and history ==
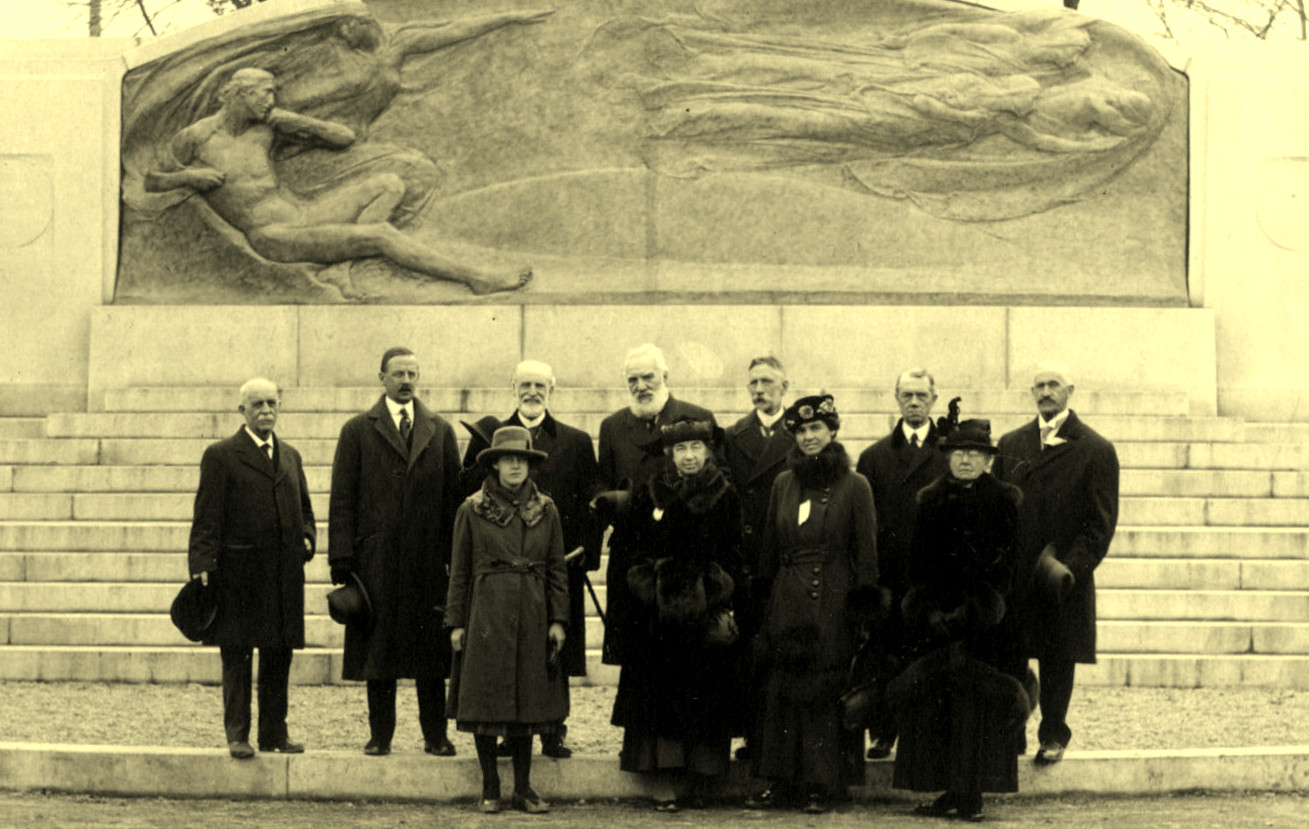
Grosvenor, front row, left, at the unveiling of the Bell Telephone Memorial in 1917. To the right is her name source and grandmother, Mabel Hubbard (Mrs. Alexander Graham Bell), and then her mother Elsie May Grosvenor. Alexander Graham Bell, her grandfather, is rear row, centre. (Courtesy: Bell Homestead National Historic Site)

Grosvenor was closely connected to her grandfather by kinship, and professionally as his secretary. She had spent considerable time with him at both the Beinn Bhreagh estate and in Washington, D.C., as well as during his international trips, and was regarded as an authority on Bell to journalists and writers who sought greater detail on the scientist-inventor.

Among her early memories of her grandfather were the occasions when the Bells doted on their 10 grandchildren. Pulitzer Prize winner and biographer Robert V. Bruce, author of the most authoritative work on Bell, described him as having "the majesty of Moses and the benevolence of Santa Claus." There were many joyful occasions when his grandchildren would sit on his lap and, on command, tweaked the nose of Bell "to produce a dog's bark, pulling his hair for a sheep's bleat, and by way of climax, tugging his Santa Claus beard for the deliciously fierce growl of a bear."

Grosvenor was a very young witness to a signature event in the Bells' development of flight at Baddeck Bay in 1907, when the Bells' associates launched the Cygnet, an early towed kite experiment of their Aerial Experiment Association. Dr. Bell later wrote: "I almost forgot to mention the witness who will probably live the longest after this event (and remember least about it) — my little granddaughter Miss Mabel Grosvenor — 2 years of age."

As a secretary and note taker to the scientist she took dictation as he explored genetics, genealogy, telecommunications and marine architecture in the form of the world's fastest boat, the HD-4, a hydrofoil propelled by two of the most powerful aircraft engines and propellers then available. Bell, far ahead of his time in support of social equality and a strong supporter of women's rights, encouraged Grosvenor's mother and grandmother to march in 1913 on the U.S. capital in support of women's right to vote. The suffragist march was 5,000 strong and drew a half-million onlookers, both supporters to the movement as well as threatening detractors.

Later in October 1920, Grosvenor accompanied Dr. Bell and her grandmother on her grandfather's "farewell visit" of Europe, where he searched for long-lost ancestors. They found several cousins he did not know existed by scouring genealogical records in Scotland, the land of Bell's birth. Grosvenor was also present when the City of Edinburgh made Dr. Bell a Burgess and presented him with its great honour, its Freedom of The City award.

== Alexander Graham Bell Club ==
The Alexander Graham Bell Club, founded in 1891, became Canada's oldest continuing women's club, and grew out of a social organization started at Beinn Bhreagh by Mabel Bell, Grosvenor's grandmother. Grosvenor was made its Honorary President until her death in 2006. The club, originally created as The Young Ladies Of Baddeck Club, was renamed in 1922 after Bell's death, and after Mabel Bell declined the use of her name.

== Gallery ==
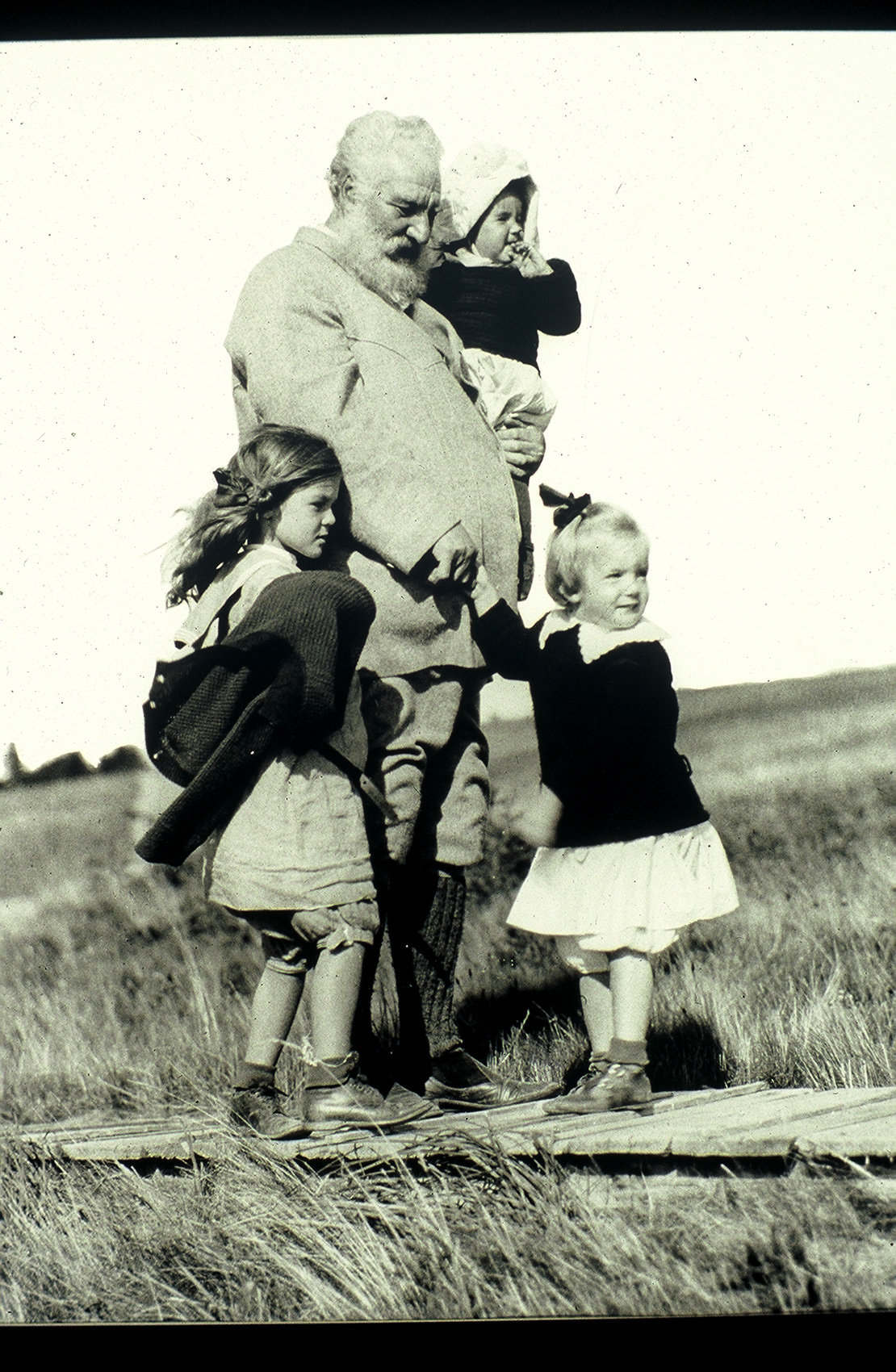
Mabel Grosvenor (right) with her grandfather, Alexander Graham Bell, at Beinn Bhreagh in 1908.

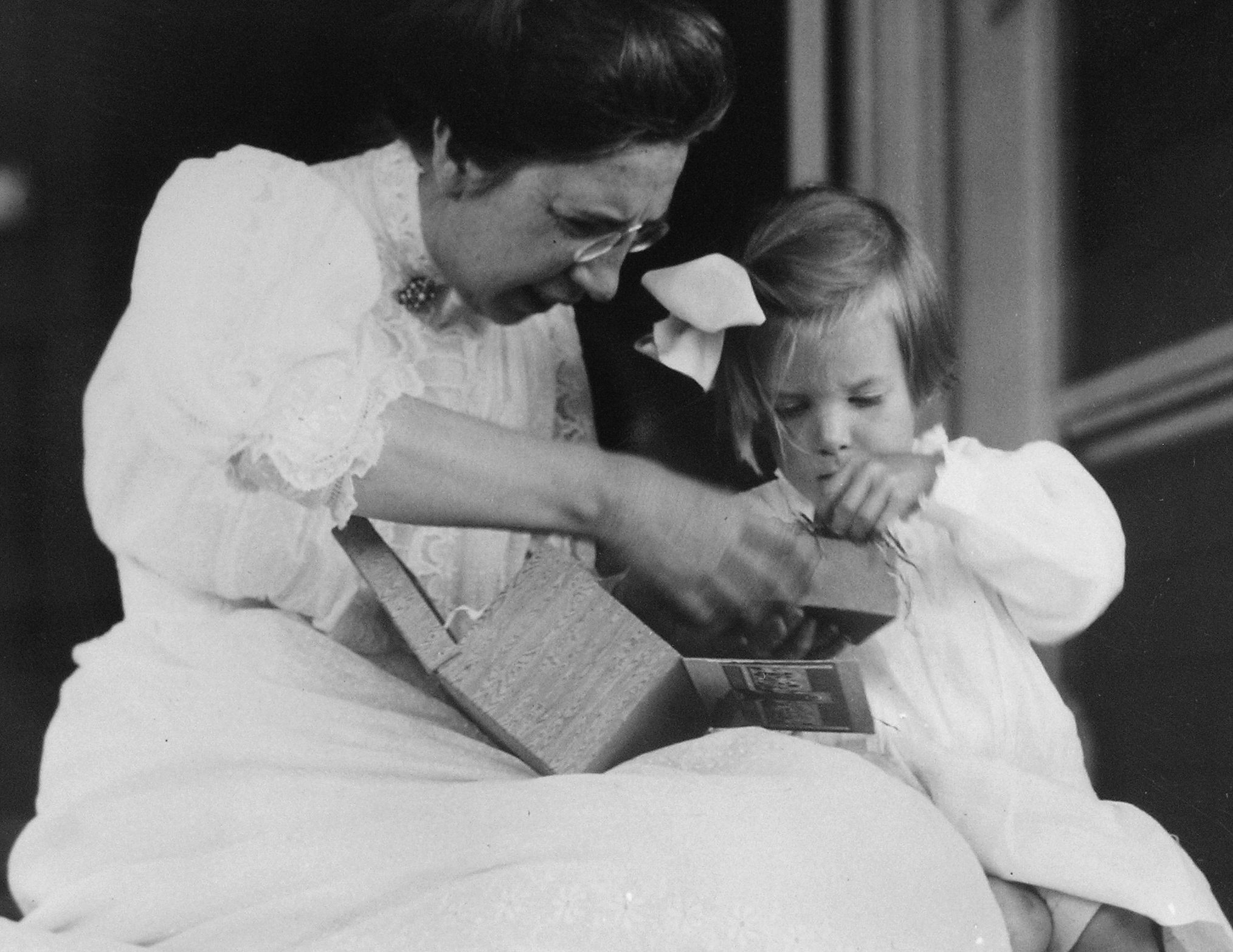
Mabel Grosvenor explores the contents of a box with her grandmother, Mabel Hubbard Bell on the steps of their summer home in Baddeck Nova Scotia.
