= The Sound and the Silence =

1992 multi-national television film

- DVD cover art
- Screenplay by: Tony Foster; John Kent Harrison; William Schmidt
- Directed by: John Kent Harrison
- Starring: John Bach; Ian Bannen; Vanessa Vaughan; Brenda Fricker
- Music by: John Charles
- Countries of origin: Canada, New Zealand
- Original language: English

Production
- Cinematography: Rene Ohashi
- Editor: Michael Horton
- Running time: 181 minutes
- Production companies: Atlantis Films; South Pacific Pictures

Original release
- Network: CTV (Canada); TNT (United States)
- Release: 18 April 1992

The Sound and the Silence is a 1992 television film directed by John Kent Harrison and starring John Bach as Alexander Graham Bell, Ian Bannen as Melville, Brenda Fricker as Eliza, and Jim McLarty as Sumner Tainter. The Sound and the Silence has a run time of 3 hours and 12 minutes and is a colorized film originally in the English language.

== Plot ==
The film begins with Bell's childhood in Scotland, where his is initially intrigued by sights and sounds. The film then follows his days as an inventor in Brantford, Ontario, Boston, Massachusetts, and Baddeck, Nova Scotia. The film was shot in New Zealand and on location at Alexander Graham Bell's Beinn Bhreagh estate in Baddeck, Nova Scotia, Canada.

== Awards ==
The Sound and the Silence won the CableACE award in 1994 for International Movie or Miniseries/Comedy or Dramatic Special or Series. The film won Gemini Awards for Best Costume Design, Best Photography in a Dramatic Program or Series, and Best Production Design or Art Direction. The film was also nominated for Geminis in the categories of Best Direction in a Dramatic Program or Mini-Series, Best Dramatic Mini-Series, and Best Performance by an Actress in a Leading Role in a Dramatic Program or Mini-Series.
