= Wendell Smith (actor) =

Canadian actor

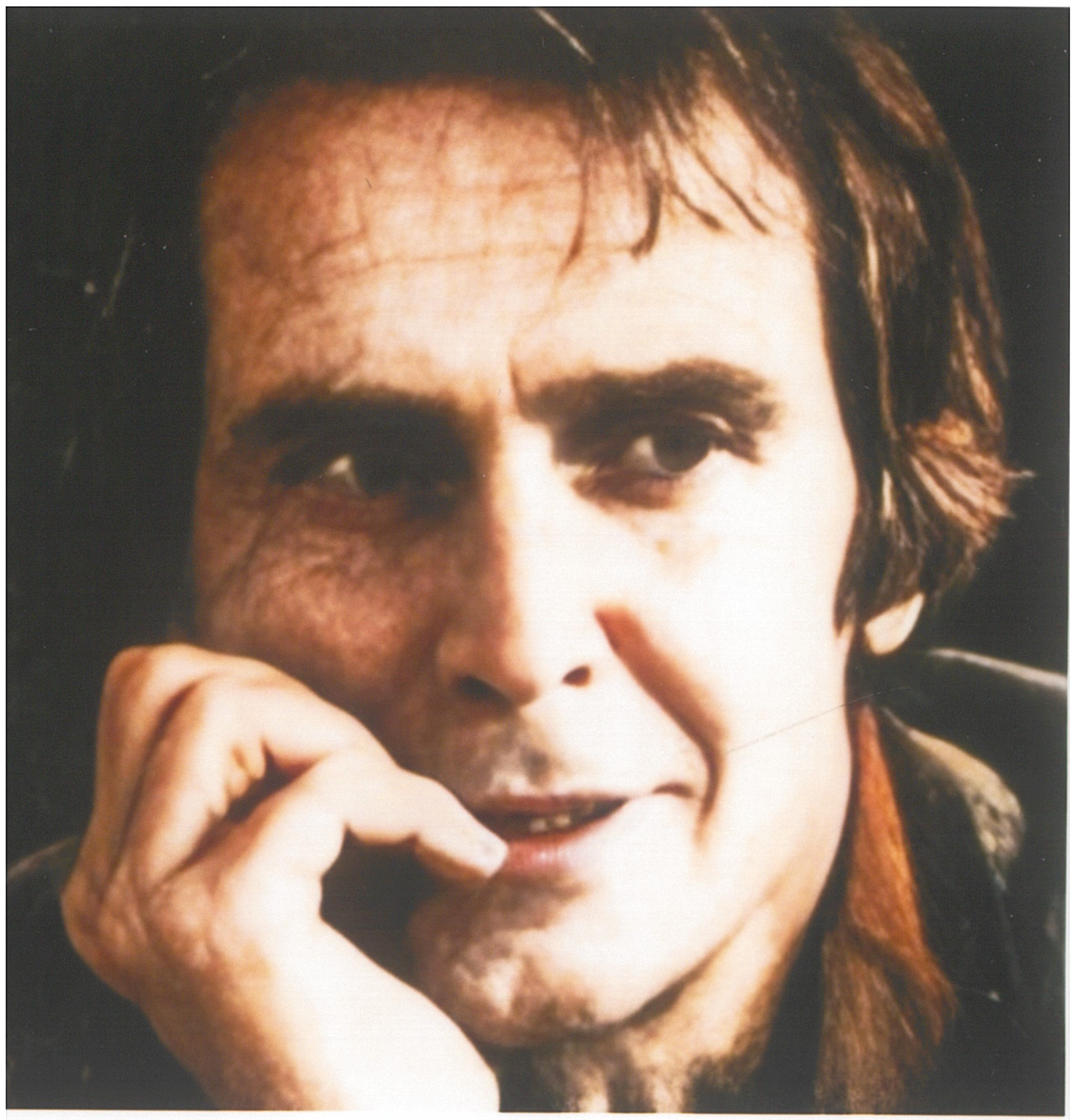
- Born: Antigonish, Nova Scotia
- Occupation: Actor
- Years active: 1970s—2010s
- Family: Stephen McHattie (brother)
- Awards: Elizabeth Sterling Haynes Award; Best Actor in a Supporting Role (1996)

Wendell Smith is a Canadian actor born in Antigonish, Nova Scotia.

== History ==
Originally based in Nova Scotia, Wendell Smith co-founded the Mulgrave Road Theatre Co-op in Guysborough in 1977. Smith has worked more frequently as a stage actor, although he has also appeared in several Canadian feature films, especially television films.

In 1978, Smith played the role of Antonio in the Citadel Theatre's production of Shakespeare's Twelfth Night. In 1980, Smith played both the part of Dr. Patrick and the part of the defense lawyer in Sharon Pollack's play Blood Relations. In 1983, Smith began workshopping plays with Theatre Calgary in Calgary, Alberta. In 1985, Smith played the lead role in Lyle Victor Albert's play White on White.

In the late 1980s and throughout the 1990s, Wendell Smith became heavily involved in the theater scene in Edmonton, Alberta; by 1988 the Edmonton Journal had described Smith as one of the "mainstays of the local acting scene." Smith was frequently involved, both as an actor and director, with Edmonton International Fringe Festival, North America's oldest and largest fringe theatre festival; for example, in 1987 Smith directed the play Ba Ba Ha at the Edmonton Fringe and in 1997 he acted in Gordon Pengilly's play Seeds at the Edmonton Fringe. Wendell Smith also appeared in the Citadel Theatre's annual production of A Christmas Carol on multiple occasions; in 1987 he played Bob Cratchit and in 1993 he played Mr. Fezziwig.

In 1999, Wendell Smith played False Arkansas Tom in the TV movie You Know My Name. Throughout the 1980s and 1990s, Smith was noted for the gravelly voice he employed as an actor.

== Recognition ==
In 1979, Keith Ashwell wrote that "Smith acts his part marvelously," and in 1985, journalist Liz Nicholls described Smith as "indisputably a gifted comedian."

In 1996, Smith won the Elizabeth Sterling Haynes Award in the category of Best Supporting Actor for his work in Jim Guedo's play Simpatico.

== Personal life ==
Wendell Smith is the older brother of Canadian actor Stephen McHattie.

== Filmography ==
Year	Title	Role
2006	Kill Syndrome	Ricketts
1999	Question of Privilege	Tavern Owner
1999	You Know My Name	False Arkansas Tom
1998	Mentors	McSween
1997	Heart Full of Rain	Old Doyle
1993	Ordeal in the Arctic	Major Blair
1988	Cowboys Don't Cry	Matt Wiley
1987	The Gunfighters	Sheriff Burrows
1987	Prom Night 2	Walt Carpenter
1983	Running Brave	Chris Mitchell
