= Bell Boatyard =

1885–1928 boatyard in Nova Scotia

Coordinates: 46.100029°N 60.724171°W

The Bell Boatyard was a boatbuilding facility which operated as part of Alexander Graham Bell's laboratories in Baddeck, Nova Scotia from 1885 to 1928. The boatyard built experimental craft, lifeboats and yachts during the first part of the twentieth century. The Bell yard was notable for its dual focus on both experimental and traditional boats and for its employment of large numbers of female boatbuilders.

== Creation ==
The laboratories and boatyard were located on the large estate that Dr. Bell acquired in 1885. Dr. Bell bought a large portion of a peninsula that jets out into the Baddeck Bay and named the estate Beinn Bhreagh. The 600-acre estate was originally built as a summer residence, but was later used year-round by the Bell family. From the beginning the estate including laboratory facilities and a boathouse which grew in size to match Bell's interests and later wartime needs. The laboratories located on Beinn Bhreagh were used for various experiments Dr. Bell created. These included his tetrahedral kites, sheep farming, manned aerial flights and development of hydrofoils. The laboratories employed carpenters, plumbers, engineers, boatbuilders and unskilled labourers. At its peak it employed 40 people working on air and water craft, both experimental and traditional.

== 1909–1914 ==
During the years after the flight of the Silver Dart and up to the start of the First World War, Bell used his laboratories to develop hydrofoils. Dr. Bell and, long-time collaborator, Casey Baldwin started their first major designs of hydrofoils in 1911 after viewing Enrico Forlanini's hydrofoil while on a world tour in Italy in 1910. In order to build the experiments labelled HD 1, HD 2, HD 3, and HD 4, (HD standing for Hydrodrome) Dr. Bell and Casey used the laboratories and staff to construct the various pieces needed.

As work progressed on the hydrofoils the main focus was for them to become submarine chasers. Before a full working prototype could be completed World War I broke out. As a citizen of the neutral United States, Dr. Bell did not want to risk breaking his country's neutrality law. So he switched the boatyard's focus from developing the military applicable HD vessels to building life boats for the Canadian Navy.

== World War I ==
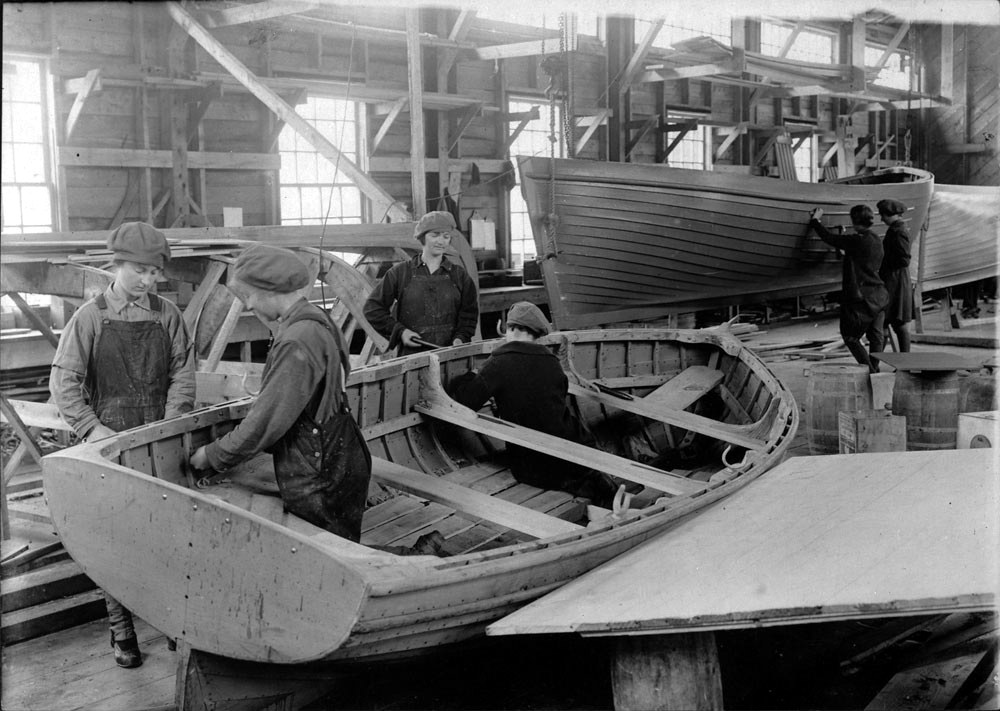
Women workers building lifeboats at Dr. Alexander Graham Bell's laboratory at Beinn Bhreagh.

The Bells often employed local women from Baddeck and other places. The main focus throughout the war was a program ran from the estate by Mabel Bell's former secretary Gretchen Schmitt. The Bells converted one of the houses on their estate into a residence for the women from out of town. During the war the Bell Boatyard consisted of a large open shed that was used as the primary shed to build the lifeboats. During this time the boatyard was managed by a Sydney native by the name of Walter Pinaud. The boat yard also produced the 55' yawl Elsie designed by naval architect George Owen and built by Walter Pinaud. Elsie was built as a gift for the Bells daughter Elsie Bell Grosvenor and her husband Gilbert Grosvenor.

== 1919–1922 ==
After the war, Dr. Bell and Casey Baldwin tried unsuccessfully to sell the HD4 to the United States Navy and the British Navy. Although both navies declined to buy or build the HD4, they were successful in achieving the water speed record of 70.86 mph which stood for a decade. After the HD4 and the life boat program the boatyard focused more on yachts but continued experimentation with high-speed vessels.

== 1922–1928 ==
After the death of Dr. Bell in 1922, Casey Baldwin inherited many of the laboratory facilities and boatyard. He built a number of custom boats. These included a 30 foot high-speed boat using the hydrodrome design ordered by the British racer Marion Carstairs, intended to achieve 115 mph. Carstairs planned to compete for the Harmsworth Cup but withdrew and the boat was completed with a more economical engine delivering 57 mph. One of the last boats made at the yard was Tolka, a 36-foot motor vessel ordered by Baldwin's brother-in-law John Lash for the Muskokas in Ontario. Completed in 1928, it included a dual-control system that was unique for the era. After production at the boatyard ceased, a large building on the site was used to store boats of the Fairchild family descendants of Mable and Dr. Bell's. That same building was eventually sold and moved on the ice during the winter to its new home. It is still (2013) in use as a barn on a farm in Middle River, on the Cabot Trail.

== See also ==
- Alexander Graham Bell Association for the Deaf and Hard of Hearing
- Alexander Graham Bell honors and tributes
- Bell Homestead National Historic Site
- Bell Telephone Memorial
- IEEE Alexander Graham Bell Medal
- Volta Laboratory and Bureau
