= Christmas in Conway =

- Promotional poster
- Genre: Romantic drama
- Written by: Stephen P. Lindsey; Luis Ugaz
- Directed by: John Kent Harrison
- Starring: Andy Garcia; Mandy Moore; Mary-Louise Parker
- Music by: Geoff Zanelli
- Country of origin: United States
- Original language: English

Production
- Executive producers: Hawk Koch; Brent Shields
- Producer: Andrew Gottlieb
- Cinematography: James Chressanthis
- Editor: David Beatty
- Running time: 96 minutes
- Production company: Hallmark Hall of Fame Productions

Original release
- Network: ABC
- Release: December 1, 2013

Christmas in Conway is a 2013 American Christmas romantic drama television film directed by John Kent Harrison, written by Stephen P. Lindsey and Luis Ugaz, and starring Andy Garcia, Mandy Moore, and Mary-Louise Parker. The film is part of the Hallmark Hall of Fame series, and premiered on ABC on December 1, 2013.

== Plot ==
When terminally-ill Suzy Mayor leaves the hospital to spend her last days at her home in Conway, South Carolina, her grouch of a husband, Duncan, is beside himself with concern for her and with annoyance at everyone else, including Natalie, the live-in hospice nurse who has come home with Suzy. When Duncan decides to build a Ferris wheel in the backyard as a Christmas present for Suzy, in honor of the place where Duncan proposed to her, the neighbors and townspeople of this quiet Southern town are quick to object.

== Cast ==
- Andy Garcia as Duncan Mayor
- Mandy Moore as Natalie Springer
- Cheri Oteri as Gayle Matthews
- Riley Smith as Tommy Harris
- Mary-Louise Parker as Suzy Mayor
- Mark Jeffrey Miller as Henry

== Production ==
The film was shot in and around Wilmington, North Carolina, in August 2013. Its score was composed by Geoff Zanelli.

== Ratings ==
During its premiere broadcast on December 1, 2013, the episode received a 1.1 rating and a 3 share in the key 18- to 49-year-old adult demographic. It was viewed by 6.45 million total viewers. The ratings were considered to be poor, and they were lower than a comparable Hallmark broadcast the previous year.

== Awards and nominations ==
The film was nominated for two MovieGuide Awards in 2014: the Faith and Freedom Award (Television), and the Free Enterprise Prize. It did not win in either category.
