= Enrico Forlanini =

Italian engineer, inventor and aeronautical pioneer

- Enrico Forlanini
- Born: December 13, 1848; Milan, Kingdom of Lombardy–Venetia
- Died: 9 October 1930 (aged 81); Milan, Kingdom of Italy
- Resting place: Cimitero Monumentale di Milano
- Education: Polytechnic University of Milan
- Known for: Works on helicopters, aeroplanes, hydrofoils and dirigibles
- Scientific career
- Fields: Engineer, inventor and aeronautical pioneer

Enrico Forlanini (13 December 1848 – 9 October 1930) was an Italian engineer, inventor and aeronautical pioneer, known for his works on helicopters, aeroplanes, hydrofoils and dirigibles. He made history in 1877 by successfully designing and flying the world’s first powered, unmanned helicopter, which proved that heavier-than-air flight was possible. His brilliant aerodynamic innovations also revolutionized airship design and maritime travel.

== Life ==
Enrico Forlanini was born in Milan on 13 December 1848. He was the son of Francesco Forlanini, a Milanese physician who later became head of Fatebenefratelli Hospital. Enrico's older brother was Carlo Forlanini, a renowned pulmonologist and two-time Nobel Prize nominee. After elementary school he attended one of the three Milan Regie Scuole Tecniche, in 1863 he entered the Military College of Turin. He graduated in 1870 with the rank of second lieutenant and was assigned to the army engineer barracks at Casale Monferrato, where he began working on a systematic testing of propellers.

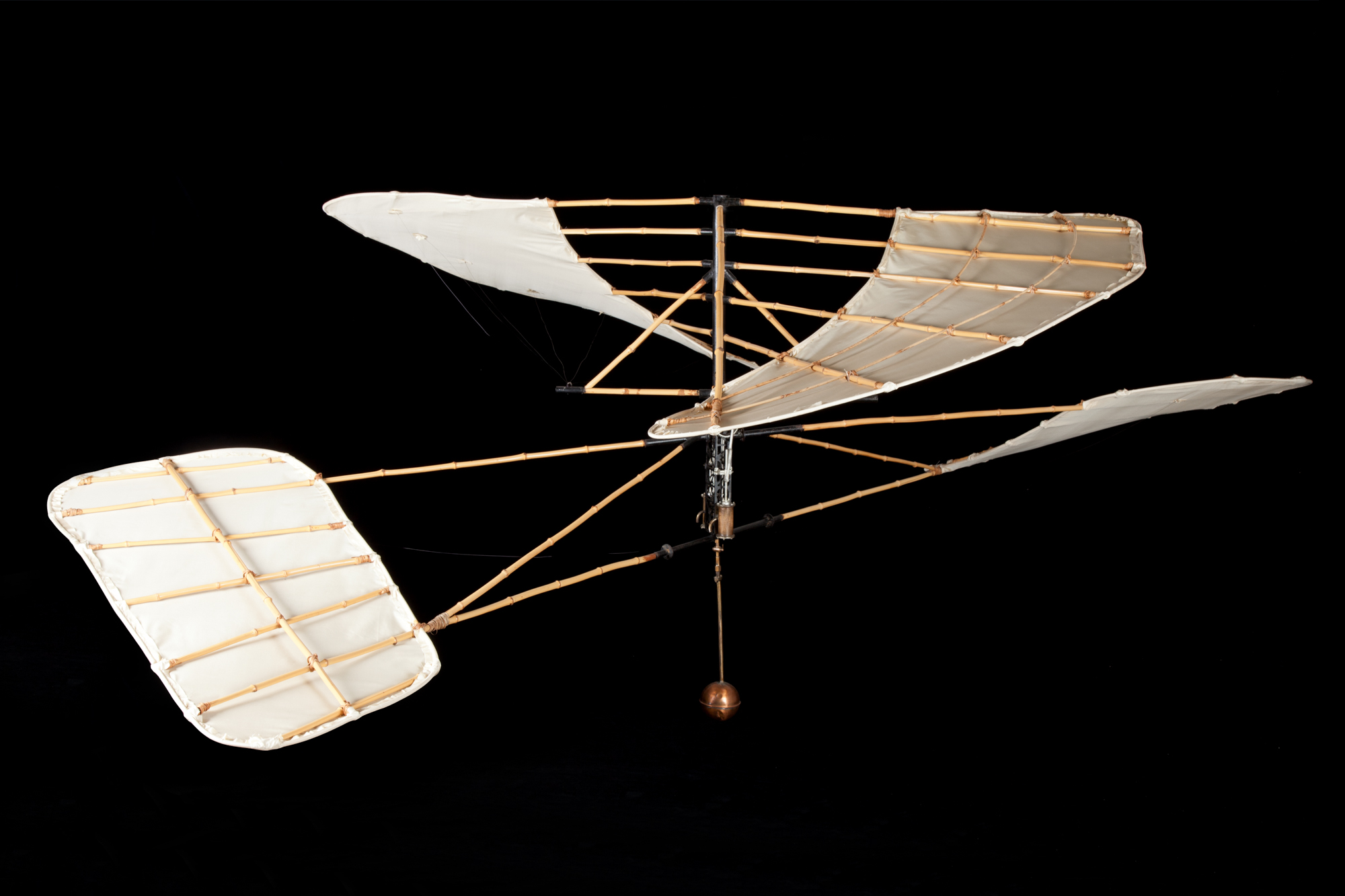
Experimental helicopter by Enrico Forlanini (1877), exposed at the Museo nazionale della scienza e della tecnologia Leonardo da Vinci of Milan

In 1874, he was granted leave of absence for study purposes and enrolled in the Engineering Department of the Polytechnic University of Milan, where he graduated as an industrial engineer in 1876. After resuming his military career, he was assigned to the army engineer barracks at Alessandria, where he designed and built an experimental helicopter, powered by a newly developed lightweight steam engine. It was sustained by two airscrews, one rotating clockwise and the other anti-clockwise, about a vertical axis of rotation. In 1877, Forlanini publicly demonstrated the helicopter in Milan's public gardens. Taking off vertically from the park's lawns, the aircraft rose to 13 metres, hovered for roughly 20 seconds, and landed gently on the grass, proving that controlled mechanical vertical flight was possible. Forlanini's experimental helicopter is widely recognized as the first heavier-than-air craft to successfully take flight powered purely by its own engine. This achievement earned him the Cagnola Prize from the Istituto Lombardo Accademia di Scienze e Lettere.

In 1878, Forlanini married Angiolina Turchi, a teacher from Forlì. That same year, he resigned from the army to take over the management of the Gazogeno & Fonderia Meccanica factory in Forlì. This factory later became Officine di Forlì, and in 1895 Forlanini became its owner. With the ample resources afforded to him by the company, he devoted himself more continuously to experimental studies on propellers, as well as aerodynamic experiments using rocket propulsion and lifting aerodynamic forms. It was from these experiments that he developed the concept of hydropters, which anticipated today's hydrofoils by many years.

In 1897, Forlanini moved to Milan, where he constructed a wind tunnel to conduct experiments on flying machines. In 1909, he completed the construction of his first airship, the F1 Leonardo da Vinci. At the time, there were two different structural concepts: rigid airships built in Germany (Zeppelin and Schütte-Lanz types), England and the USA, and soft airships like the French Astra-Torres, the German Parseval type and the Italian Ausonia and Usuelli type. Forlanini created an intermediate type of airship, which was later called "semi-rigid". With only minor modifications, the F1's structural concept was subsequently adopted by almost all airship manufacturers in Italy and became known as the 'Italian-type airship'. The Leonardo da Vinci' airship successfully completed its maiden flight in Milan on 27 November 1909 at an altitude of 40 metres.

A second experimental airship called F2 Città di Milano followed. It was completed in 1910 at the Baggio aircraft shipyards. A distinctive feature of the F2 — and a feature that would be applied to subsequent models — was its two-shell structure: a central shell to seal the gas and an outer shell made of a different material to protect against damage from external atmospheric agents and act as an insulating envelope.

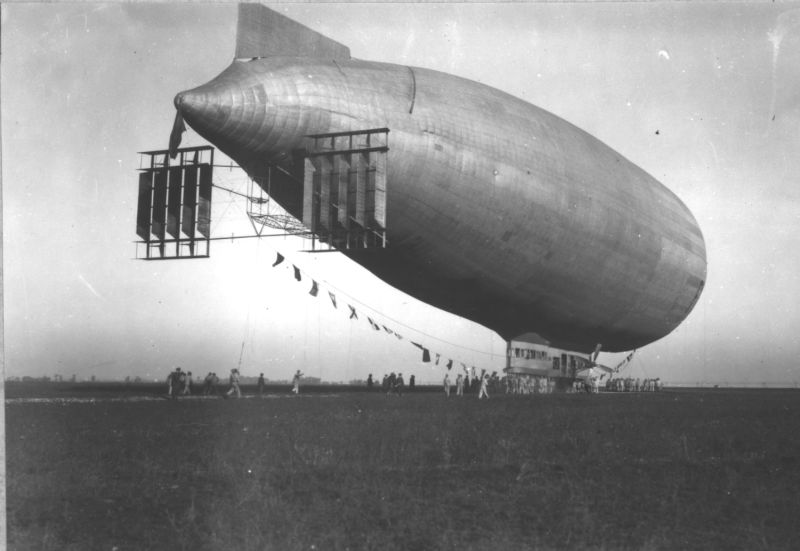
Forlanini's F6 airship

The first non-experimental airship was the F3, built in 1915 and called the 'Città di Milano 2, which was commissioned by the British government. The subsequent F4 was ordered by the Regia Marina, while the F5 and F6 were built between 1916 and 1918 for the Regia Aeronautica during World War I. These had a volume of over 15,000 m³ and were powered by 240 hp engines, allowing them to reach speeds of 80 km/h. During the war years, Forlanini designed 'high-altitude airships', capable of reaching altitudes of 4,000 metres.

Following World War I, Enrico Forlanini attempted to adapt his semi-rigid airships for commercial passenger transport. In June 1919, he successfully conducted a demonstration flight with passengers along the Milan-Venice route using his F.6 airship model, and later attempted to establish regular services on Roma-Napoli routes. However, these initiatives failed to gain traction, and operations ended shortly thereafter.

At the Fourth International Congress of Air Navigation in Rome on 24 September 1927, Forlanini presented a paper entitled 'On the Theme of Superaviation' (Rome, 1927). Forlanini described "superaviation" as flight outside the Earth's atmosphere, which he defined as navigating through a vacuum. Because traditional propellers require air, Forlanini identified the reaction engine as the sole viable method of propulsion in a vacuum. By anticipating engines that could operate in space, he essentially predicted the development of future spacecraft and artificial satellites.

Forlanini died in 1930, still working on the design of a semi-rigid experimental airship called Omnia Dir. His family and Silvio Bassi, Forlanini's closest collaborator and then professor of aeronautical engineering at the Milan Polytechnic, decided to complete its construction, both to demonstrate the validity of the new aircraft and to honour the inventor's memory. The airship was the first to use compressed air jets/valves mounted at the bow and stern. These jets provided precise directional control, allowing ground crews to easily taxi the airship into its hangar. Test runs showed that, while the system worked, it was extremely slow.

== Airships ==
Later he designed and built a series of dirigibles, notably, designed in 1901 and launched in 1909, the Leonardo da Vinci that he dedicated to the famous Renaissance inventor and, in 1912, the Città di Milano, dedicated to his beloved home town. The latter showed exceptionally good characteristics of stability and controllability that won Forlanini international renown. A further four airships were constructed: F3, F4, F5 and F6. A seventh, named Omnia Dir was only completed after his death.

== Hydrofoils ==
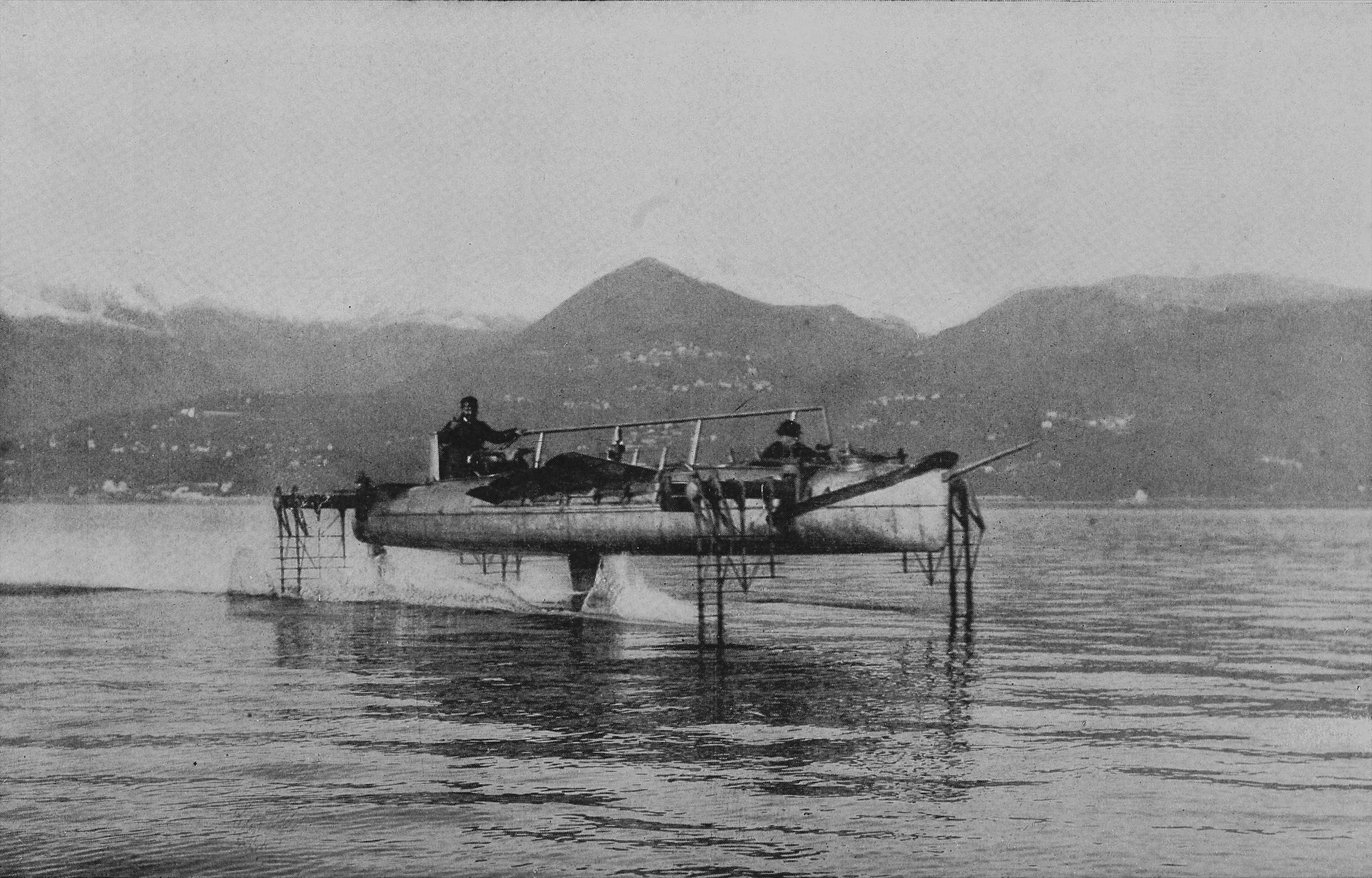
Forlanini hydrofoil on Lake Maggiore circa 1911

He is also known for his hydrofoils that he started modelling in 1898. One of these, built at full scale, used a ladder system of foils and a 45 kW (60 hp) engine driving two counter-rotating air props. During testing on Lake Maggiore in 1906, this craft reached a top speed of 68 km/h (42 mph) He also tested a hydrofoil with a 19 kW (25 hp) steam engine but this only achieved around 50 km/h (31 mph) in 1908-1909. During a world tour in the spring of 1911, Alexander Graham Bell test-rode Forlanini’s "ladder" hydrofoil boat on Lake Maggiore in Italy. Thrilled by the smooth, high-speed ride, Bell acquired the U.S. license to build and develop this technology. This Italian expedition inspired Bell and his chief engineer, Frederick Walker Baldwin, to pursue their own hydrofoil experiments in North America. After returning to Bell's massive estate and boatyard at Beinn Bhreagh near Baddeck, Nova Scotia, they designed a series of experimental prototypes. These efforts ultimately culminated in the famous HD-4 hydrofoil.

== Legacy ==
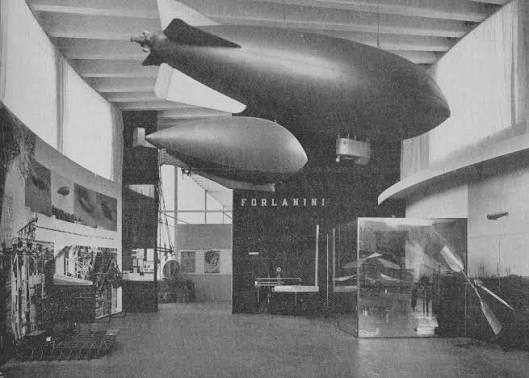
Sala Forlanini at the Esposizione Aeronautica Italiana

Forlanini obtained a number of British and American patents on his ideas and designs, most of which were aimed at seaplane applications.

Jules Verne mentions Forlanini in Chapter VI of his 1886 novel Robur the Conqueror, and his studies inspired Verne's depiction of The Terror, an advanced, multi-purpose supermachine invented by the fanatical engineer Captain Robur in Master of the World (1904).

Forlanini’s contributions to aviation were celebrated at the Esposizione Aeronautica Italiana (Italian Exhibition of Aeronautics) in 1934. The exhibition took place at the Palazzo dell'Arte in Milan, running from June to October, and featured a dedicated Sala Forlanini (Forlanini Room) curated by the prominent BBPR architectural firm. Milan has dedicated its city airport to Enrico Forlanini, also named Linate Airport, as well as the nearby park, the Parco Forlanini. In Milan there is Avenue Viale Enrico Forlanini.
