= Alexander Graham Bell National Historic Site =

Coordinates: 46.1028°N 60.7458°W

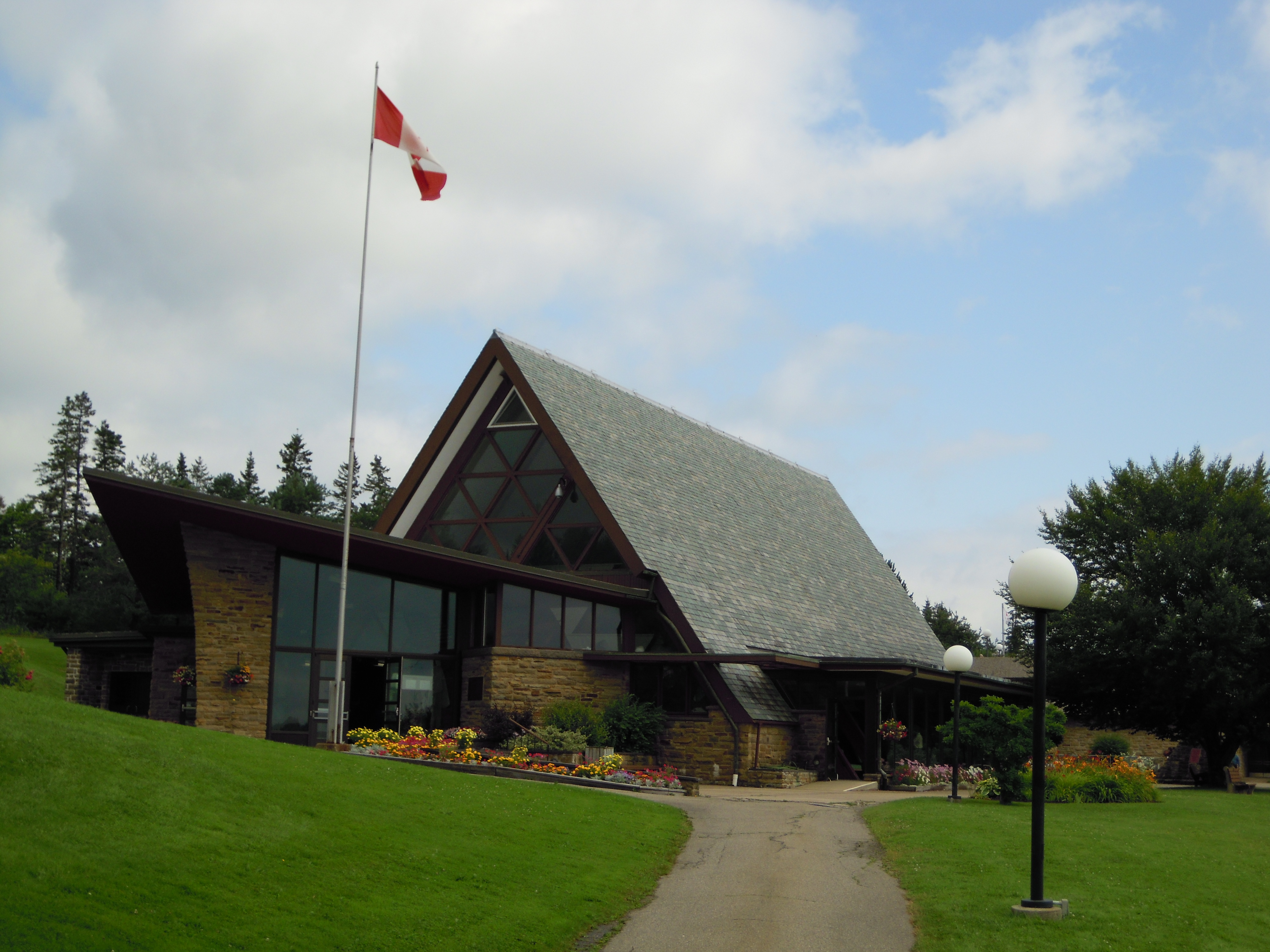
- Visitor centre at the Alexander Graham Bell National Historic Site
- Location: Baddeck, Nova Scotia
- Built: 1954
- Website: Alexander Graham Bell National Historic Site

National Historic Site of Canada
- Designated: 1959

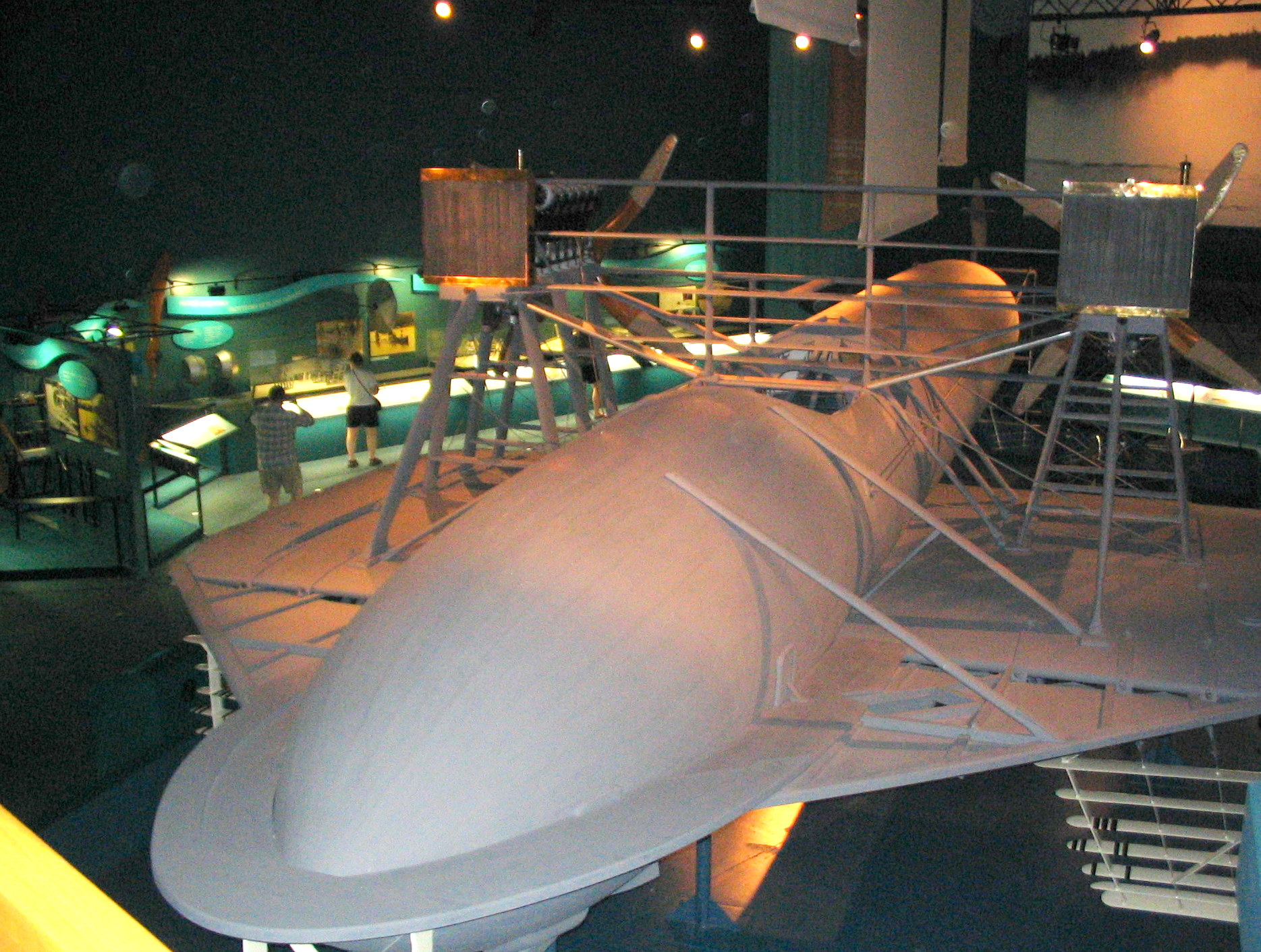
Bell's experimental HD-4 hydrofoil in the museum. Designed for anti-submarine duty, it held the world's marine speed record for several years.

Alexander Graham Bell National Historic Site is a 10-hectare (25-acre) property in Baddeck, Cape Breton, Nova Scotia, Canada, overlooking the Bras d'Or Lakes. The site is a unit of Parks Canada, the national park system, and includes the Alexander Graham Bell National Historic Site, which contains the largest repository of artifacts and documents from Bell's years of experimental work in Baddeck. This site was designated a National Historic Site in 1952.

== Alexander Graham Bell National Historic Site ==
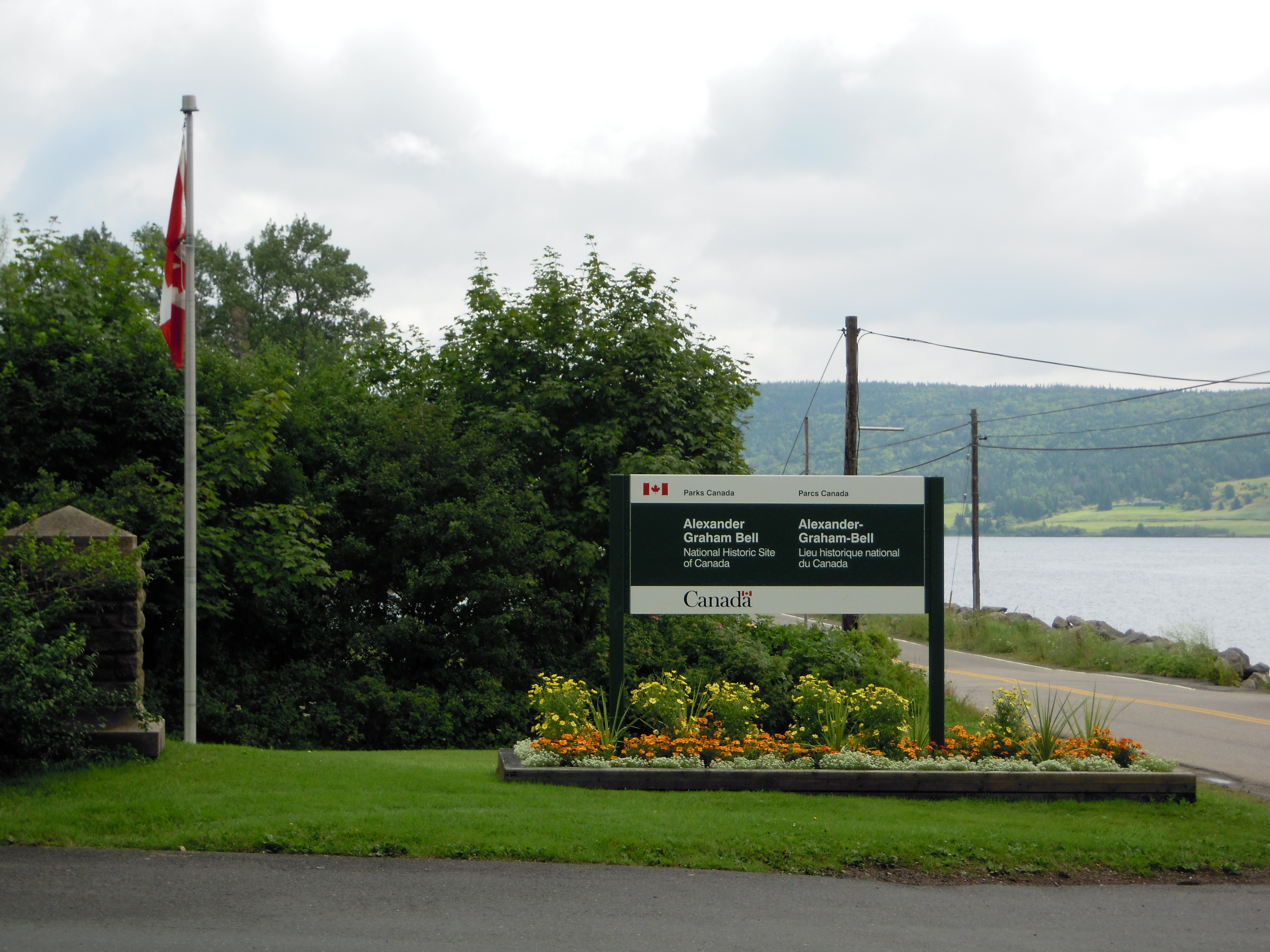
Entrance to Alexander Graham Bell National Historic Site

The site features artifacts donated in 1955 from the Bell family's personal museum, located in the Kite House at Beinn Bhreagh. The site also features memorabilia associated with Bell's experiments, including: the original hull of a hydrofoil boat, the HD-4, that set a world marine speed record in Baddeck by reaching speeds of over 112 km/h (over 70 mph) in 1919; a full-scale replica of that boat, the AEA Silver Dart, which in 1909 J.A.D. MacCurdy piloted up into the air over the ice of Baddeck Bay to become the first controlled heavier-than-air craft to be flown in the British Empire. Plus many other exhibits and documents from Bell's years of research activities on the transmission of speech and sound by wire and by light, as well as his experiments with kites, planes and high speed boats. The museum also features displays relating to Bell's work with in the field of deaf education and how it led to the invention of the telephone. The Alexander Graham Bell Historic Site was designed by Canadian government architect O. Howard Leicester, R.I.B.A. The architects for the Museum building were the Canadian architecture firm of Wood, Blachford, Ship (A. Campbell Wood, Hugh W. Blachford, Harold Ship).

In addition to its displays, the museum features an observation deck on the roof of the building offering a view of Bell's Beinn Bhreagh estate, across the bay. Beinn Bhreagh is a separate National Historic Site, still privately owned and occupied by Bell's descendants. It is not in the national park system and is not open to the public. (For more information, see Bras d'Or Lakes.)

== See also ==
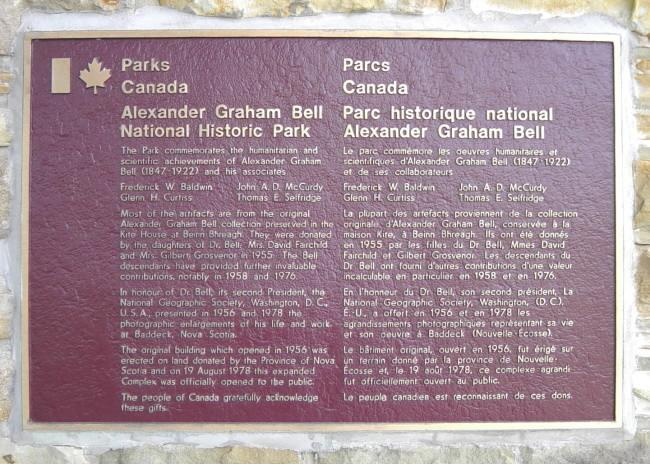
A plaque at the Alexander Graham Bell National Historic Site

- Alexander Graham Bell honors and tributes
- Alexander Graham Bell School, Chicago, Illinois
- Beinn Bhreagh, Nova Scotia, the Bell estate on the peninsula of the same name
- Bell Boatyard
- Bell Homestead National Historic Site, Brantford, Ontario
- Bell Telephone Memorial, Brantford, Ontario
- IEEE Alexander Graham Bell Medal
- Index of Alexander Graham Bell articles
- National Historic Sites of Canada
- Parks Canada
- Volta Laboratory and Bureau, Washington, D.C.
