= HD-4 =

Early hydrofoil watercraft

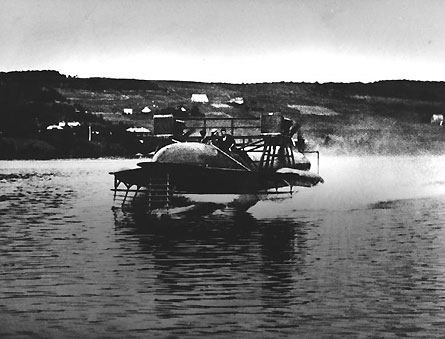
- HD-4 at Baddeck, Nova Scotia, in 1919

History

Canada
- Name: HD-4
- Namesake: Hydrodome number 4
- Builder: Alexander Graham Bell
- Launched: 1919
- Home port: Baddeck, Nova Scotia

HD-4 or Hydrodome number 4 was an early research hydrofoil watercraft developed by the scientist Alexander Graham Bell. It was designed and built at the Bell Boatyard on Bell's Beinn Bhreagh estate near Baddeck, Nova Scotia. In 1919, it set a world marine speed record of 114 kilometres per hour (70.86 mph).

== History ==
The March 1906 Scientific American article by American pioneer William E. Meacham, explained the basic principle of hydrofoils and hydroplanes. Bell considered the invention of the hydroplane a very significant achievement. Baldwin studied the work of the Italian inventor Enrico Forlanini and began testing models based on his designs, which led them to the development of hydrofoil watercraft. Based on information gained from that article he began to sketch concepts of what is now called a hydrofoil boat. Bell, with his chief engineer Casey Baldwin, began hydrofoil experiments in the summer of 1908. During Bell's world tour of 1910–1911, Bell and Baldwin met with Forlanini in Italy, where they rode in his hydrofoil boat over Lake Maggiore. Baldwin described it as being as smooth as flying.

On returning to Bell's large laboratory and boatyard at his Beinn Bhreagh estate near Baddeck, Nova Scotia, they experimented with a number of designs, culminating in HD-4. In 1913, Dr. Bell hired Walter Pinaud, a Sydney yacht designer and builder as well as the proprietor of Pinaud's Yacht Yard in Westmount to work on the pontoons of HD-4. Pinaud soon took over the Bell Boatyard at Beinn Bhreagh. Pinaud's experience in boat-building enabled him to make useful design changes to HD-4. After the First World War, work began again on HD-4. Bell's report to the U.S. Navy permitted him to obtain two 350 brake horsepower (260 kW) Liberty V-12 engines in July 1919.

Bell and associate Frederick W. "Casey" Baldwin began hydrofoil experimentation in the summer of 1908, as a possible aid to airplane takeoff from water. On September 9, 1919, on the Bras d'Or Lakes, at Baddeck, HD-4 set a world marine speed record of 114 kilometres per hour (70.86 mph), that stood for almost a year until being beaten by Gar Wood in Miss America.

== Museum display ==
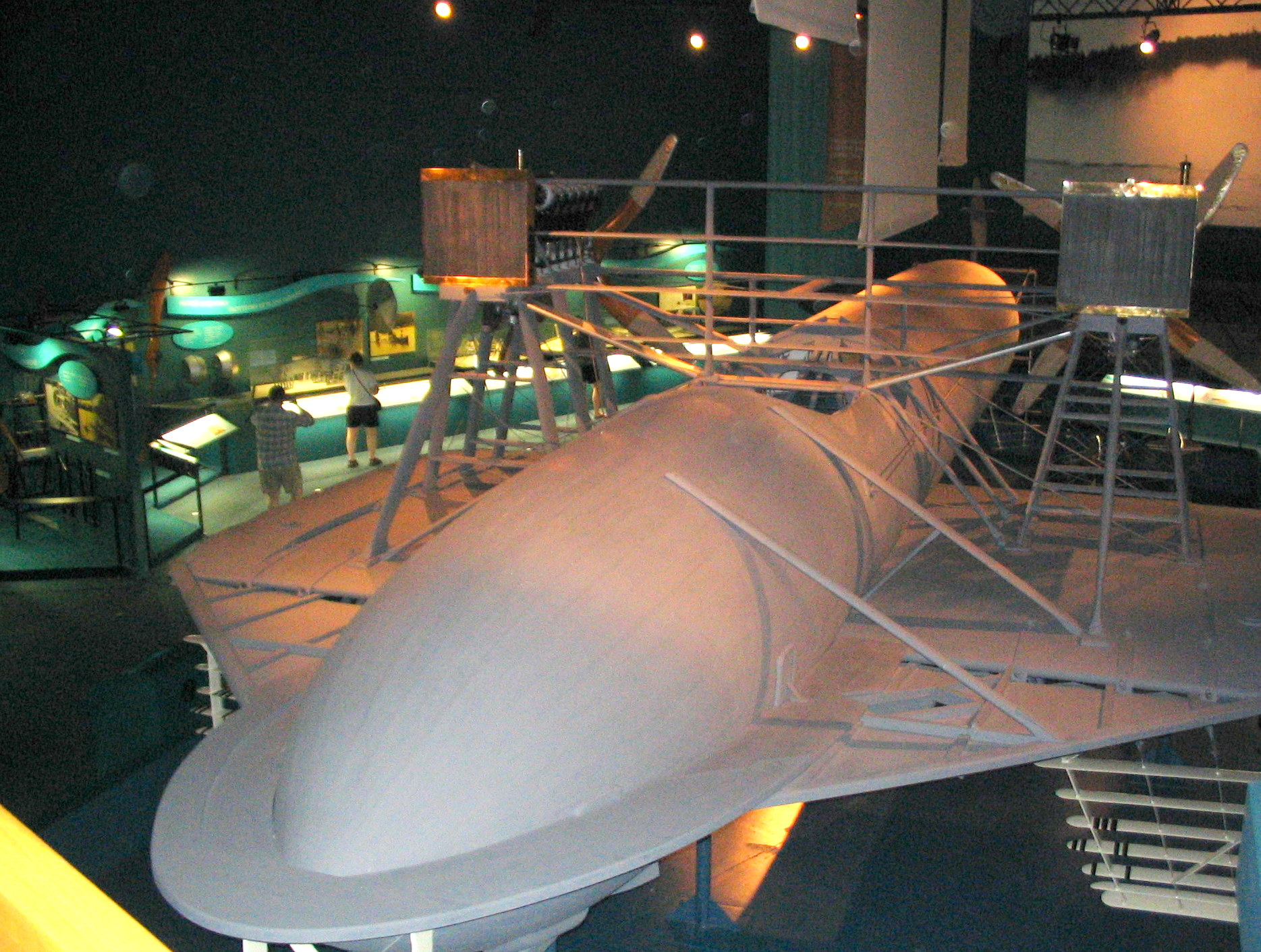
HD-4 hydrofoil at the Alexander Graham Bell museum

A full-scale replica of Bell's HD-4 is viewable at the Alexander Graham Bell museum in Baddeck, Nova Scotia, Canada.

== See also ==
- Bras d'Or (R-103), a small experimental hydrofoil built for the Royal Canadian Navy (RCN) during the 1950s
- HMCS Bras d'Or (FHE 400), a hydrofoil that served in the Canadian Forces from 1968 to 1971, and the fastest unarmed warship in the world for several years
