= John Kent Harrison =

Canadian film and television director

- Born: 1947 (age 78–79); London, Ontario, Canada
- Education: Appleby College; Columbia University; Concordia University
- Occupations: Director; writer
- Years active: 1980–present
- Awards: CableACE Award; Canadian Screen Award; Christopher Award; Kidscreen Award; Toronto Sprockets International Film Festival for Children award Bronze Wrangler award

John Kent Harrison is a Canadian film and television director and writer.

== Early life ==
Harrison was born in London, Ontario, in 1947 and attended the private school Appleby College in Oakville, Ontario. After graduating in 1964, he attended Columbia University in New York, then briefly worked as a stock broker before returning to school. He earned a Master's degree at Montreal’s Concordia University, and stayed, becoming assistant professor of Film Studies at Concordia University. While there, he wrote and directed several films. He moved to Los Angeles in 1984.

== Career ==
Harrison has directed 32 projects, and written 21, most of which won, or were nominated for, numerous awards in acting and craft categories. Harrison has received several nominations for writing and directing.

His 1992 film The Sound and the Silence, which he wrote and directed, won the 1994 CableACE Award for best International Movie or Miniseries/Comedy or Dramatic Special or Series. His 1997 adaptation of William Faulkner’s Old Man won the 1997 Christopher Award for Best Film. You Know My Name won the Bronze Wrangler for Television Feature Film at the National Cowboy & Western Heritage Museum’s 2000 Western Heritage Awards. At the 2003 Toronto Sprockets International Film Festival for Children, A Wrinkle in Time won the Audience Award for Best Feature Film. L.M. Montgomery's Anne of Green Gables won the award for Best One-Off, Special or TV Movie at the 2017 Kidscreen Awards. Harrison won the 2018 Canadian Screen Award for Best Direction, Children’s or Youth, for Anne of Green Gables: Fire and Dew.

== Personal life ==
In 1969, following graduation from university, Harrison and a friend paddled an 18-foot canoe from their home town of London, Ontario, through the Canadian river systems to Lake Erie, then down the Mississippi to New Orleans, where Mayor Victor H. Schiro awarded them Honorary Citizenship and the Key to the City.

Harrison is the father of Canadian author Sabrina Ward Harrison.

He holds dual Canadian-American citizenship. In 2013, he married his second wife, American producer Gretchen Miller and has since lived in Portland, Oregon.

== Filmography ==
Director

- The Way of the Willow - short film, Catalyst Films 1981
- Thanks for the Ride - short film, National Film Board of Canada 1983
- The Hitchhiker - Best Shot – series episode, Chester/Perlmutter/Markowitz Productions 1987
- Beautiful Dreamers - feature, National Film Board of Canada 1990
- The Sound and the Silence - TV Movie, Atlantis Films/South Pacific Pictures 1992
- City Boy - TV Movie, Western International Communications et al 1992
- Whose Child Is This? The War for Baby Jessica - TV Movie, Western International Communications et al 1993
- For the Love of Aaron - TV Movie, Patterdale Productions/The Storytellers Group 1994
- Johnny’s Girl - TV Movie, Signboard Hill Productions 1995
- The Ranger, the Cook and a Hole in the Sky - TV Movie, Signboard Hill Productions 1995
- Old Man - TV Movie, Hallmark Hall of Fame 1997
- What the Deaf Man Heard - TV Movie, Hallmark Hall of Fame 1997
- You Know My Name - TV Movie, Ancient Mariner Films 1999
- A House Divided – TV Movie, Paramount Television et al 2000
- In Love and War - TV Movie, Hallmark Hall of Fame 2001
- Helen of Troy - Mini-series, Fireworks Entertainment et al 2003
- A Wrinkle in Time - TV Movie, Fireworks Entertainment et al 2003
- The Winning Season – TV Movie, Viacom Productions/TNT et al 2004
- A Bear Named Winnie – TV Movie, Original Pictures/PowerCorp 2004
- Judging Amy – Revolutions Per Minute – TV episode, 20th Television et al 2005
- Faith: Pope John Paul II – Mini-series, Rai Fiction et al 2005
- The Water Is Wide - TV Movie, Hallmark Hall of Fame 2006
- Crossroads: A Story of Forgiveness - TV Movie, Hallmark Hall of Fame 2007
- The Courageous Heart of Irena Sendler - TV Movie, Hallmark Hall of Fame 2009
- When Love Is Not Enough: The Lois Wilson Story - TV Movie, Hallmark Hall of Fame 2010
- A Walk in My Shoes – TV Movie, Procter & Gamble Productions 2010
- Change of Plans – TV Movie, Muse Entertainment 2011
- Game of Your Life – TV Movie, Procter & Gamble Productions/Rosemont Productions 2011
- Christmas in Conway - TV Movie, Hallmark Hall of Fame 2013
- Hattie’s Heist – short film, Ferns Productions 2014
- L.M. Montgomery's Anne of Green Gables - TV Movie, Breakthrough Entertainment 2016
- Anne of Green Gables: Fire and Dew - TV Movie, Breakthrough Entertainment 2017
- Anne of Green Gables: The Good Stars - TV Movie, Breakthrough Entertainment 2017

Writer

- Shock Waves - feature, Zopix Company 1977
- Voice of the Fugitive – drama short, National Film Board of Canada 1978
- Bravery in the Field – drama short, National Film Board of Canada 1979
- Coming Out Alive - feature, Canadian Broadcasting Corporation 1980
- The Way of the Willow - short film, Catalyst Films 1981
- Murder by Phone - feature, Telefilm Canada 1982
- The Hitchhiker - Best Shot – series episode, Chester/Perlmutter/Markowitz Productions 1987
- Beautiful Dreamers - feature, National Film Board of Canada 1990
- Tropical Heat - She– TV series episode, National Film Board of Canada 1991
- The Sound and the Silence - TV Movie, Atlantis Films/South Pacific Pictures 1992
- City Boy - TV Movie, Western International Communications et al 1992
- Johnny’s Girl - TV Movie, Signboard Hill Productions 1995
- Calm at Sunset - TV Movie, Hallmark Hall of Fame 1996
- You Know My Name - TV Movie, Ancient Mariner Films 1999
- A Bear Named Winnie – TV Movie, Original Pictures/PowerCorp 2004
- Faith: Pope John Paul II – Mini-series, Rai Fiction et al 2005
- The Courageous Heart of Irena Sendler - TV Movie, Hallmark Hall of Fame 2009
- Change of Plans – TV Movie, Muse Entertainment 2011
- Game of Your Life – TV Movie, Procter & Gamble Productions/Rosemont Productions 2011
- Hattie’s Heist – short film, Ferns Productions 2014
- Anne of Green Gables: The Good Stars - TV Movie, Breakthrough Entertainment 2017
