= Cromwell, Oklahoma =

- Town
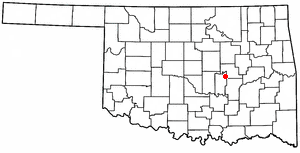
- Location of Cromwell, Oklahoma
- Coordinates: 35°21′1″N 96°27′32″W
- Country: United States
- State: Oklahoma
- County: Seminole

Area
  - Total: 0.59 sq mi (1.53 km^{2})
  - Land: 0.59 sq mi (1.53 km^{2})
  - Water: 0 sq mi (0.00 km^{2})
- Elevation: 961 ft (293 m)

Population (2020)
  - Total: 238
  - Density: 401.7/sq mi (155.08/km^{2})
- Time zone: UTC-6 (Central (CST))
  - Summer (DST): UTC-5 (CDT)
- ZIP code: 74837
- Area code: 405
- FIPS code: 40-18450
- GNIS feature ID: 2412388
- Website: www.cromwellok.org

Cromwell is a town in Seminole County, Oklahoma, United States. It is within the jurisdiction of the Muscogee (Creek) Nation. The population was 238 at the time of the 2020 census. It was named for oilman Joe I. Cromwell, who platted the original town in 1923. The population soared to several thousand people in a few weeks, and lawlessness was rampant in the community. Retired legendary Old West lawman Bill Tilghman was hired as Town Marshal to restore order. Tilghman was shot to death the following year, the most notable event in Cromwell's history.

== History ==
Founded in 1923, and named for Muscogee oilman, Joe I. Cromwell, Cromwell had a post office on May 17, 1924.

Cromwell was a wild and wooly town in the early 1920s. The town was said to be full of saloons, brothels and outlaws. About 150 businesses operated in Cromwell during the 1920s, many selling moonshine alcohol and narcotics to residents of the surrounding area. However, about seventy of these were permanently closed during an enforcement drive. The illegal sales continued because a Federal Prohibition Unit agent named Wiley Lynn was connected to mobster Arnold Killian.

On Halloween night, 1924, Cromwell Town Marshal and legendary Old West lawman Bill Tilghman was shot outside of a cafe called "Ma Murphy's", by the corrupt prohibition agent Wiley Lynn. Tilghman died in the early morning hours of the first of November. Tilghman had been brought in to help bring the town under control. One month later the town of Cromwell was torched, with every brothel, bar, flop house and pool hall burned to the ground, allegedly by friends of Tilghman. There was no investigation into the massive fire, and Cromwell never recovered its former wild status, or size.

== Geography ==
According to the United States Census Bureau, the town has a total area of 1.1 square miles (2.8 km^{2}), all land.

== Demographics ==
Historical population
Census	Pop.	Note	%±
1930	249		—
1940	451		81.1%
1950	313		−30.6%
1960	269		−14.1%
1970	287		6.7%
1980	337		17.4%
1990	268		−20.5%
2000	265		−1.1%
2010	286		7.9%
2020	238		−16.8%
U.S. Decennial Census

=== 2020 census ===
As of the 2020 census, Cromwell had a population of 238. The median age was 41.0 years. 29.4% of residents were under the age of 18 and 17.6% of residents were 65 years of age or older. For every 100 females there were 110.6 males, and for every 100 females age 18 and over there were 107.4 males age 18 and over.

0.0% of residents lived in urban areas, while 100.0% lived in rural areas.

There were 89 households in Cromwell, of which 34.8% had children under the age of 18 living in them. Of all households, 49.4% were married-couple households, 19.1% were households with a male householder and no spouse or partner present, and 21.3% were households with a female householder and no spouse or partner present. About 15.8% of all households were made up of individuals and 4.5% had someone living alone who was 65 years of age or older.

There were 96 housing units, of which 7.3% were vacant. The homeowner vacancy rate was 2.6% and the rental vacancy rate was 0.0%.

Racial composition as of the 2020 census
Race	Number	Percent
White	172	72.3%
Black or African American	1	0.4%
American Indian and Alaska Native	41	17.2%
Asian	1	0.4%
Native Hawaiian and Other Pacific Islander	0	0.0%
Some other race	0	0.0%
Two or more races	23	9.7%
Hispanic or Latino (of any race)	6	2.5%

=== 2000 census ===
As of the census of 2000, there were 265 people, 97 households, and 77 families residing in the town. The population density was 247.7 inhabitants per square mile (95.6/km^{2}). There were 113 housing units at an average density of 105.6 per square mile (40.8/km^{2}). The racial makeup of the town was 71.70% White, 0.75% African American, 19.25% Native American, 3.02% from other races, and 5.28% from two or more races. Hispanic or Latino of any race were 3.02% of the population.

There were 97 households, out of which 36.1% had children under the age of 18 living with them, 57.7% were married couples living together, 15.5% had a female householder with no husband present, and 20.6% were non-families. 17.5% of all households were made up of individuals, and 11.3% had someone living alone who was 65 years of age or older. The average household size was 2.73 and the average family size was 3.08.

In the town, the population was spread out, with 29.1% under the age of 18, 4.9% from 18 to 24, 24.2% from 25 to 44, 26.8% from 45 to 64, and 15.1% who were 65 years of age or older. The median age was 40 years. For every 100 females, there were 84.0 males. For every 100 females age 18 and over, there were 84.3 males.

The median income for a household in the town was $30,833, and the median income for a family was $31,607. Males had a median income of $18,750 versus $21,250 for females. The per capita income for the town was $12,751. About 15.2% of families and 20.1% of the population were below the poverty line, including 30.0% of those under the age of eighteen and none of those 65 or over.

== Education ==
It is in the Butner Public Schools school district.

== Schoolton ==
Schoolton is a populated place now located within the official boundaries of Cromwell. It is located north about 4 miles from the central district of Cromwell on Oklahoma State Highway 56, just north of Interstate 40.

The settlement had a post office from December 19, 1907, to June 30, 1917; an earlier post office named Irene was situated at this same approximate location until November 28, 1907. The Schoolton name was chosen by one William P. Weston, a local educator, in recognition of plans for a fine school system in the town.
