= Wiley Lynn =

American murderer (1888–1932)

- Born: May 28, 1888; Madill, Oklahoma
- Died: July 17, 1932 (aged 44); Madill, Oklahoma
- Cause of death: Gunshot wounds
- Occupation: Corrupt Prohibition agent

Wiley Ulysses Lynn (May 28, 1888 – July 17, 1932) was an American prohibition agent during the early 20th century, best known for having killed legendary lawman Bill Tilghman, on November 1, 1924, in Cromwell, Oklahoma.

== Early life ==
Wiley Lynn was born in Madill, Oklahoma, the son of a farmer; the family were enrolled Choctaw citizens. Lynn is listed on the Dawes Rolls as 1/32nd "Choctaw by Blood". On August 14, 1905, he married Allie M. Banks of Ardmore, Oklahoma, they had two sons. Lynn worked in the Oklahoma oilfields as a laborer and as a mechanic; in 1918, when he registered for the draft, it noted that he was an oilfield mechanic for the Rosana Petroleum Company out of Wirt, Oklahoma, and that on one of his hands "the forefinger was off and the thumb and middle finger stiff."

Lynn accepted an appointment as a Prohibition Unit agent assigned to the town of Cromwell, Oklahoma.

== Prohibition agent, Cromwell, Oklahoma ==
In 1924, Cromwell was a seedy and extremely dangerous town, which thrived on the many brothels and saloons that were located there. The town was out of control by that time, with no law in force. Wiley Lynn, the prohibition agent assigned to the area, was a big part of the problem. For a number of years, Lynn worked deals with bootleggers and other illegal factions, keeping them out of jail in exchange for money paid to him.

Bill Tilghman, a former Deputy US Marshal, was retired from law enforcement by 1910, and was 70 years old in 1924. However, he had a stellar reputation, and was a legend for his part in bringing down the Doolin Dalton Gang in the 1890s. Tilghman had been elected to the Oklahoma Senate. He also accepted the position of police chief of Oklahoma City in 1911. In 1915, he co-wrote, directed, and starred in the film The Passing of the Oklahoma Outlaws, which dramatized the law enforcement activities of Tilghman and the other members of the Three Guardsmen, which included Heck Thomas and Chris Madsen. The film is noted as an early attempt to de-glamorize the image of outlaws. In 1924, Tilghman accepted a position as marshal of Cromwell, Oklahoma, to "clean up the town".

From early on in the job, he and Lynn were clearly rivals. Tilghman made several arrests for prohibition violations, only to have Lynn step in and set his prisoners free. Despite Tilghman suspecting Lynn, he had no definite proof with which to expose Lynn. Tilghman had been welcomed in by the town's non-criminal element, but was not popular with the brothel and saloon owners or patrons.

On November 1, 1924, Tilghman was seated inside Murphy's Café with a friend and his Deputy Marshal, Hugh Sawyer. Wiley Lynn pulled up outside in a vehicle along with prostitute Eva Caton and her companion, a US Army sergeant named Thompson, as well as prostitute Rose Lutke. Lynn exited the vehicle, and discharged his pistol into the street. He was obviously intoxicated, and Tilghman immediately responded. Tilghman grabbed Lynn, and along with Sawyer disarmed him. However, Lynn had a second pistol which he quickly drew and shot Tilghman twice in the stomach and chest at point blank range. Tilghman slumped, then fell into the street. Wiley Lynn then fled the scene, turning himself in at the Federal District Headquarters in Holdenville, Oklahoma, pleading self defense.

Deputy Hugh Sawyer never fired a shot. If Sawyer had been a more experienced deputy, Lynn would have likely been killed on the spot. However, Deputy Marshal Sawyer was inexperienced, and froze when the shot was fired, watching Lynn as he fled, then going to Tilghman's aid. He also later testified that he could not see clearly exactly what happened.

Lynn was acquitted after a trial. One key eyewitness failed to appear in court for the trial, having fled to Florida after being threatened and in fear of his life if he testified. The witness did write a letter to former U.S. Marshal Evett Dumas Nix, in Guthrie, Oklahoma, in which he stated there was no doubt what he saw, and that there was no doubt that Wiley Lynn murdered Tilghman. However, a letter would not suffice. Also, eyewitness Rose Lutke had disappeared, and never resurfaced. To make matters worse for the prosecution, Deputy Marshal Hugh Sawyer, whether he was coerced or incompetent, testified that he could not see clearly as to what actually happened.

One month after the murder, the town of Cromwell was burned to the ground, with every brothel and saloon being torched. There was no investigation into the arson, and no arrests were made. It was always suspected that lawmen who were friends to Tilghman torched the town. Cromwell never recovered, dwindling to just over 300 residents.

== Shootout in Madill ==
Wiley Lynn survived the trial, and amazingly continued to work in his prohibition agent position for a very short time, but eventually lost his job. He was married, and had two sons, but his life went into a downward spiral after the Tilghman shooting. His wife took their children and left him. He was arrested several times for drunkenness in Wewoka, Oklahoma and Shawnee, Oklahoma, as well as other minor offenses.

Years passed, and by 1932 he was in Madill, Oklahoma, living 5 mi (8.0 km) out of town with his parents. He clashed on more than one occasion with Oklahoma State Bureau of Investigation Agent Crockett Long, who was assigned to that area, and who had made no secret that he disliked Lynn, Long having known and been friends with Tilghman. Agent Long arrested Lynn several times, and Lynn blamed Long for his failure to be hired by the State Bureau of Investigations. Crockett Long had a substantial reputation for being good in a gunfight. He had previously that same year been involved in a gunfight with Pretty Boy Floyd, with Floyd escaping.

On the night of July 17, Wiley Lynn came into Madill, apparently searching for night watchman John Glenn initially, with whom he had argued previously. Lynn entered the Corner Drug Store, intoxicated, where Long was visiting with stock buyer Bill Baker, and the local undertaker Paul Watts. Lynn approached the men with his pistol in his hand, and stated to Long "Put 'em up, you son of a bitch, I'm going to get you sometime so it might as well be now".

Long, who was hard of hearing, actually didn't hear Lynn at first. However, when he noticed that several store patrons were scrambling to leave the store, Long turned to see Wiley Lynn with his pistol pointed at him. Long quickly and calmly said "Put that gun down, Lynn". Despite Lynn having his pistol pointed at Long, the latter drew his own gun and the two men fired simultaneously, with witnesses saying it sounded like only one shot, despite there having been two. By that time, the store owners Forney Keller and Jack Blalock had fled, and patron Knute Turley had dropped to his hands and knees crawling outside.

Rody Watkins and John Hilburn, two young men who were standing at the soda fountain, were both hit by the bullet fired by Wiley Lynn, which had passed through the body of Crockett Long. Patron W. C. Wynne was standing at the door when the shooting started, and saw the first exchange. Both men continued to fire at one another until their weapons were emptied. Both were hit five times each, at close range, and while advancing on one another.

Wiley Lynn staggered out of the store and across the street to a service station, where citizen Clyde Lewis took him to a doctor. Agent Crockett Long was taken by ambulance to the Von Keller Hospital in Ardmore, Oklahoma. John Hilburn was not seriously wounded, but Rody Watkins was also rushed to the hospital. Agent Long, Wiley Lynn, and bystander Rody Watkins all died while in surgery.
