= Beinn Bhreagh =

Former estate of Alexander Graham Bell in Victoria County, Nova Scotia, Canada

Beinn Bhreagh Hall
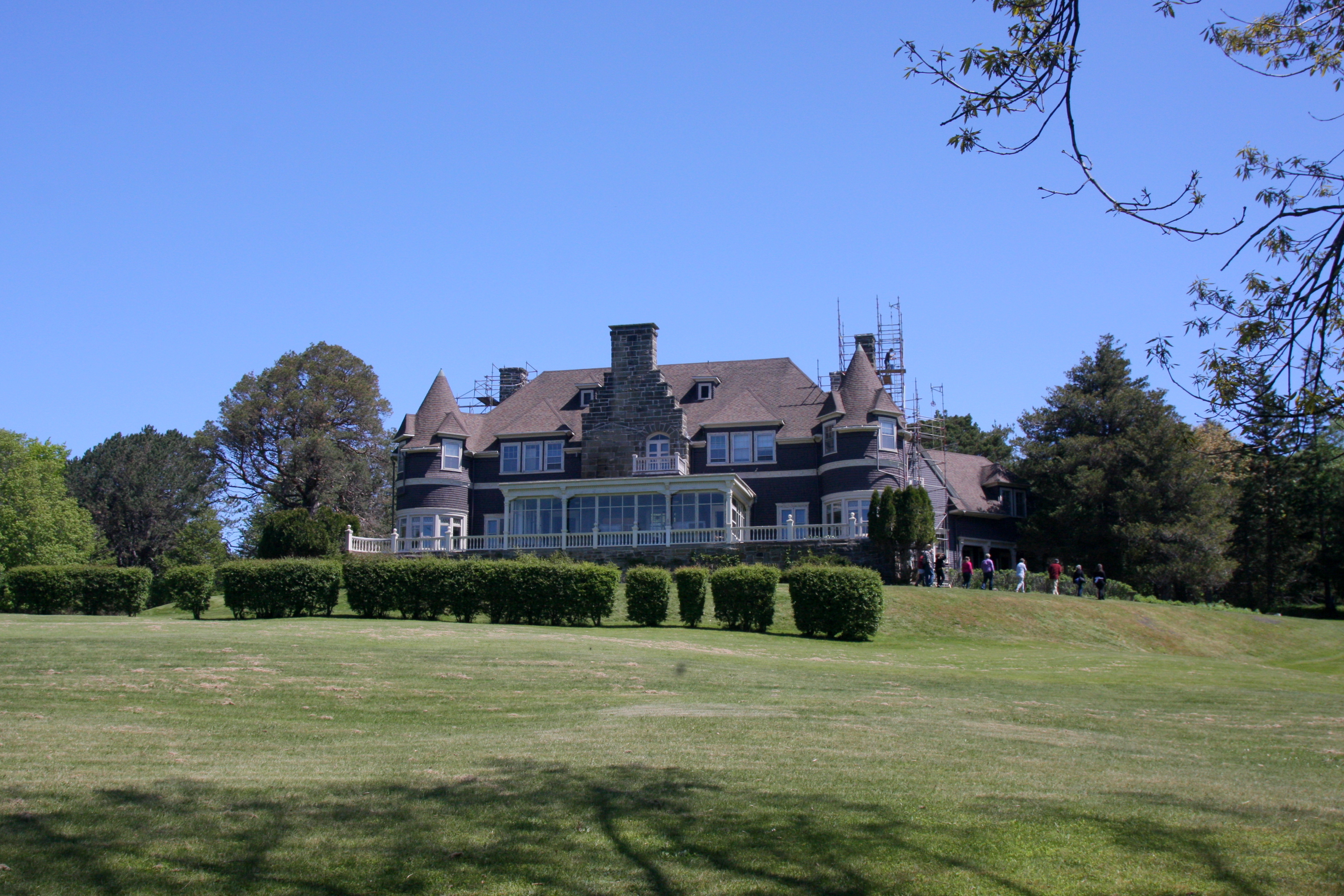
- The second and larger home, Beinn Bhreagh Hall (known locally as "The Point") was built in 1893 on the Beinn Bhreagh estate of Alexander Graham & Mabel Bell at Baddeck.

General information
- Location: Baddeck, Cape Breton, Nova Scotia, 998 Beinn Breagh Rd, Baddeck, NS B0E 1B0, Canada
- Coordinates: 46°05′40.6″N 60°42′57.5″W
- Year built: 1893
- Construction started: 1888
- Owner: Alexander Graham Bell

Beinn Bhreagh (/ˌbɛn ˈvriːə/ ben VREE-ə) is the name of the former estate of Alexander Graham Bell, in Victoria County, Nova Scotia, Canada. It refers to a peninsula jutting into Cape Breton Island's scenic Bras d'Or Lake approximately three kilometres (two miles) southeast of the village of Baddeck, forming the southeastern shore of Baddeck Bay.

The peninsula was known to the Mi'kmaq as Megwatpatek, roughly translated to "Red Head" due to the reddish sandstone rocks at the tip of the peninsula. The name Beinn Bhreagh—meaning "Beautiful Mountain" in Scottish Gaelic—is thought to have been given to the peninsula by Bell, who purchased approximately 242.8 hectares (600 acres) to form the estate in the late 1880s.

In July 2005, the Nova Scotia Civic Address Project review changed the status of Beinn Bhreagh from a "generic locality" to a "community".

== Alexander Graham Bell ==
Wealthy from his successful invention and marketing of the telephone, inventor Alexander Graham Bell and his wife, Mabel, undertook a cruising vacation in 1885 along the coast of eastern North America with their intended destination being Newfoundland to view a mining operation that Mabel's father, Gardiner Greene Hubbard, had invested in. Along the way, the accidental grounding of their passenger boat made them serendipitously discover Cape Breton's Bras d'Or Lake, and they were enthralled by their surroundings.

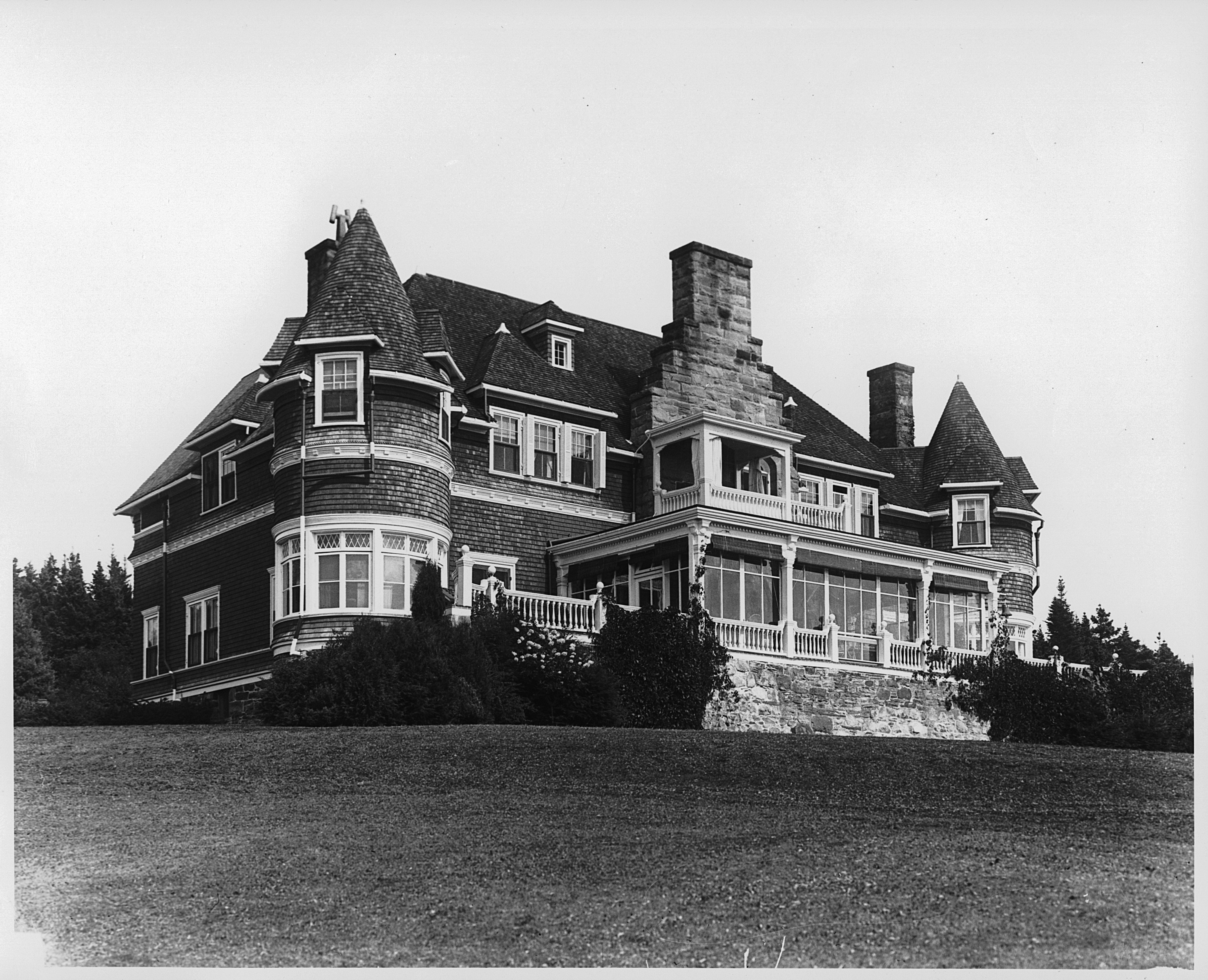
Beinn Bhreagh Hall taken by William Notman & Son in 1915.

Its landscape, climate, and Scottish traditions and culture were reminiscent of his birthplace in Edinburgh, Scotland. The Bells lived increasingly on Beinn Bhreagh from about 1888 until his death in 1922, initially only in the summer and then later often year-round.

Bell constructed a laboratory and boatyard on this property, conducting experiments in powered flight and hydrofoil technology, among many other things. Some of his most notable accomplishments at Beinn Bhreagh included the first manned flight of an airplane in the British Commonwealth (by the AEA Silver Dart) in 1909, plus the HD-4, a hydrofoil boat designed by Frederick Walker Baldwin and Bell, and built at Beinn Bhreagh. Designed as a submarine chaser and powered by aircraft engines, their vessel set a world watercraft speed record of 114 km/h (71 mph) in 1919, which remained unbroken for many years.

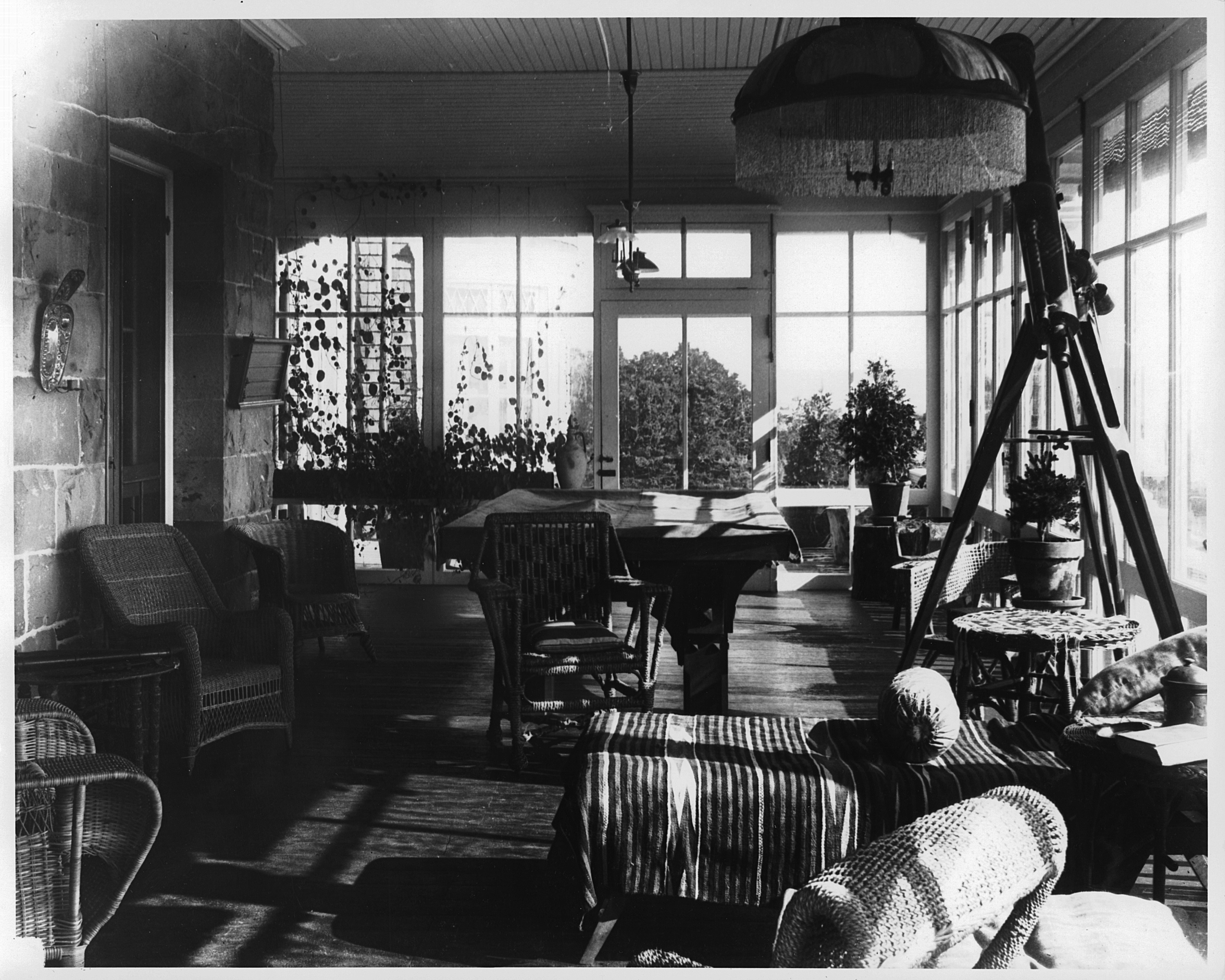
Porch of Beinn Bhreagh Hall taken by William Notman & Son in 1915.

The Bells were both buried atop Beinn Bhreagh mountain, on the estate, overlooking Bras d'Or Lake. The 242.8-hectare (600-acre) estate owned by the Bells is on the peninsula at the end of Beinn Bhreagh Road. It is now owned by their many descendants, is not open to the public, and is not visible from Beinn Bhreagh Road. The Bells' first residence on Beinn Bhreagh, the "Lodge", was built in 1888. The second and larger home, Beinn Bhreagh Hall (known locally as "The Point") was built in 1893. Both are visible from Baddeck, across Baddeck Bay. More information and pictures of the estate can be found by visiting the Alexander Graham Bell National Historic Site, a national park system unit and museum managed by Parks Canada, which contains many objects that were donated to the nation by Bell's descendants. The museum was designated a National Historic Site in 1952, while Beinn Bhreagh Hall was named a National Historic Site in 2018.

== National Geographic Society maps ==
Alexander Graham Bell's father-in-law, Gardiner Greene Hubbard, was the first president of the National Geographic Society and Bell was its second president. Bell's son-in-law Gilbert Hovey Grosvenor was president of the National Geographic Society for many years, and his grandson, Melville Bell Grosvenor, and great-grandson Gilbert Melville Grosvenor were editors of the National Geographic Magazine and also presidents of the society. Perhaps as a result, both Beinn Bhreagh or Baddeck, the nearest town, are prominently displayed in National Geographic maps of the area, despite their relatively small size.

== Gallery ==
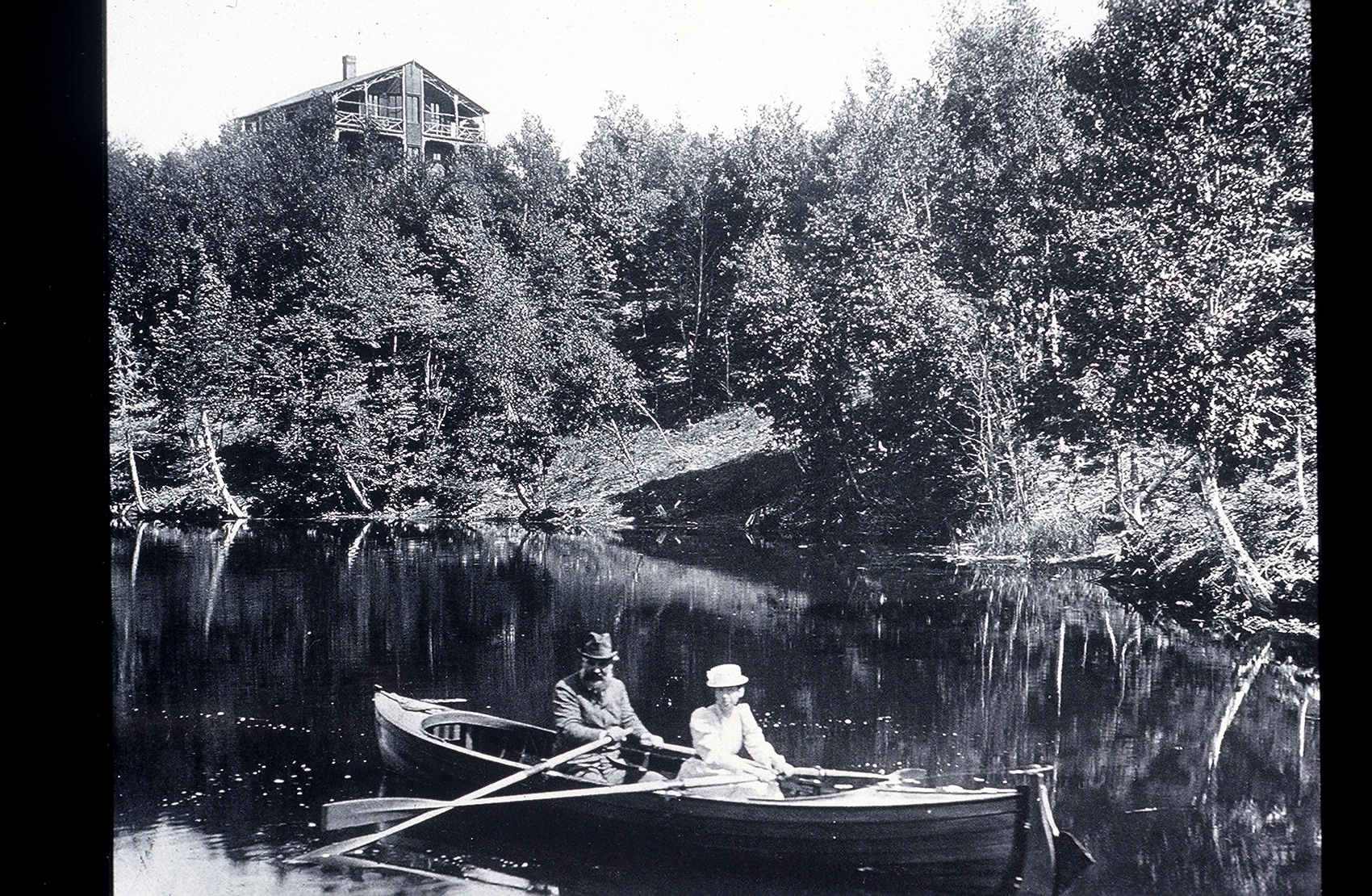
Beinn Bhreagh's little harbor offered the Bells opportunities for recreation, and later a shelter area for experiments in aviation and hydrofoils.

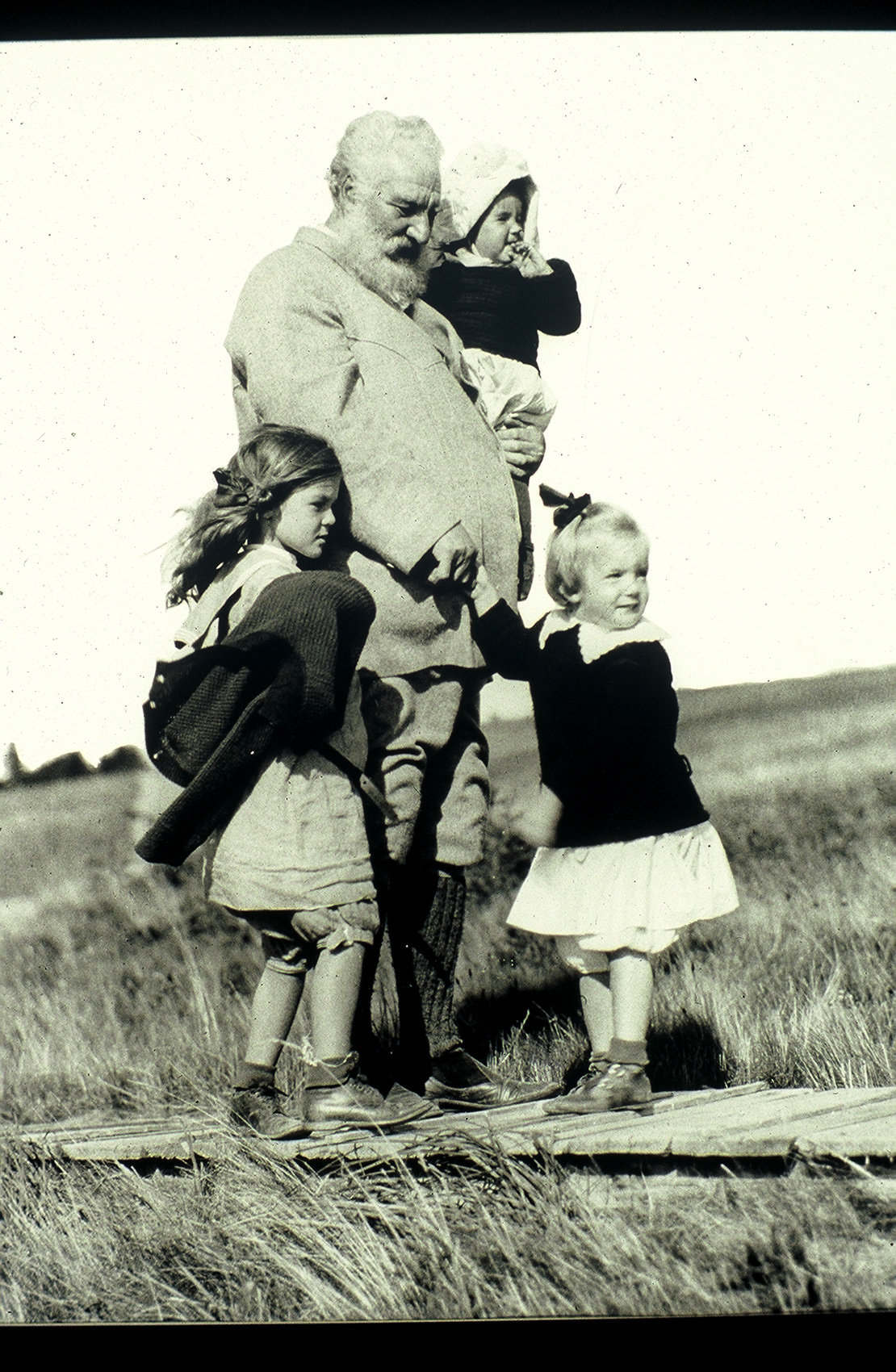
Alexander Graham Bell relaxing on Beinn Bhreagh with three of his granddaughters.

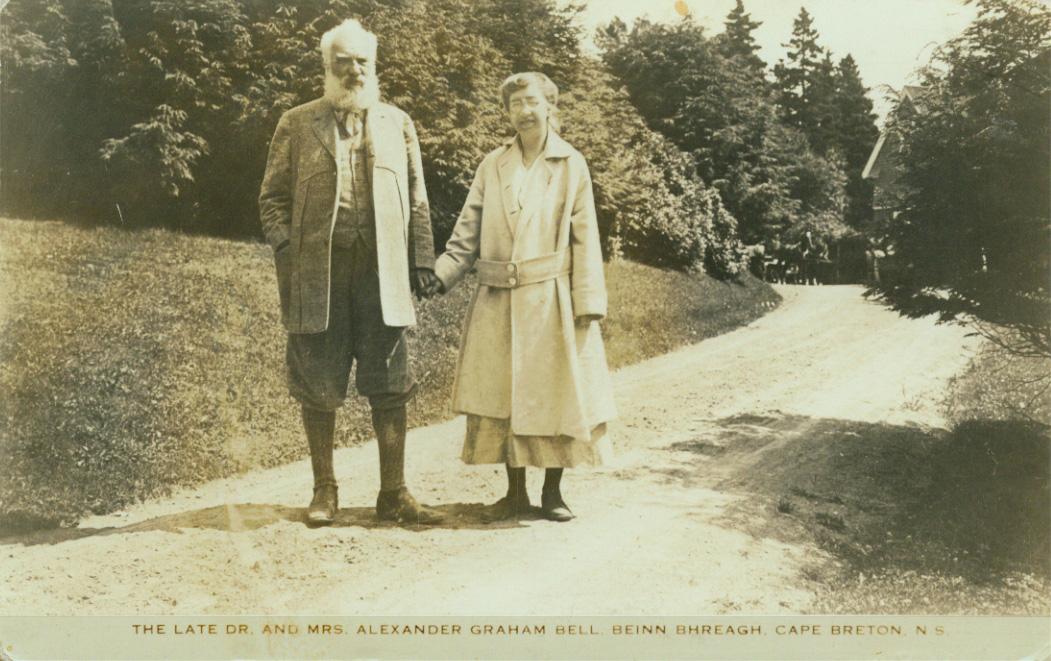
Mabel and Alexander Graham Bell were depicted in a postcard walking in front of their home, Beinn Bhreagh Hall.

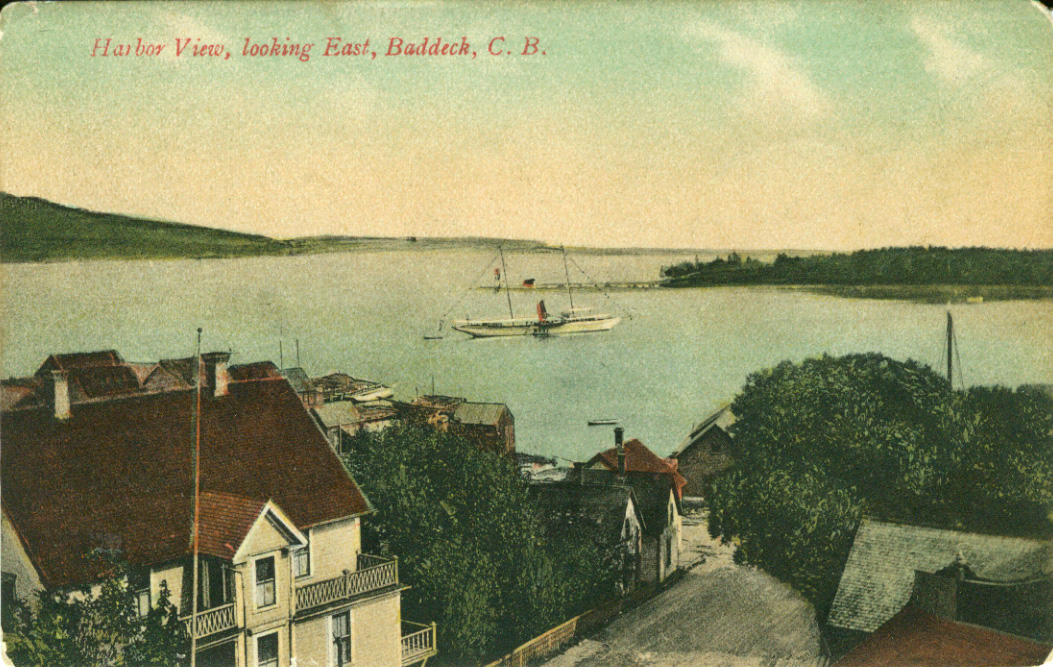
Red Head Point and the peninsula of Beinn Bhreagh can be seen across the bay from the town of Baddeck, Nova Scotia in a 1906 postcard.

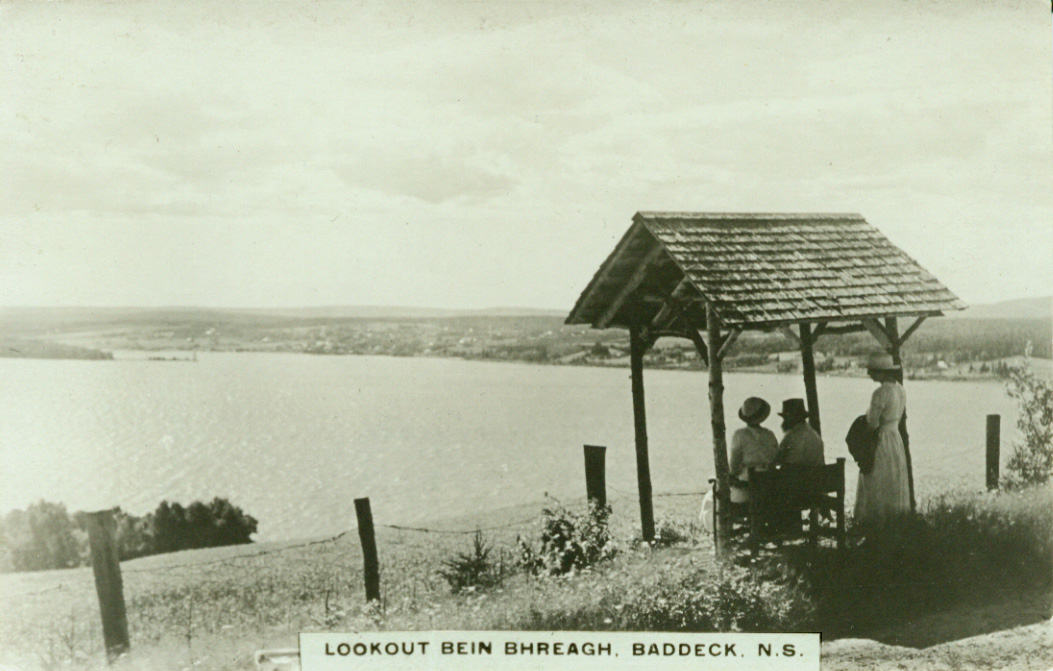
The town of Baddeck can be seen from one of the lookouts on Beinn Bhreagh in a postcard from the 1920s.

== See also ==
- Alexander Graham Bell National Historic Site, Baddeck, Cape Breton, Nova Scotia, Canada
- Bell Boatyard, part of the Beinn Bhreagh estate
- Bell Homestead National Historic Site, Brantford, Ontario, Canada
- Bell Memorial
- Mabel H. Grosvenor, last surviving grandchild and personal secretary of Alexander Graham Bell, and a steward of the Beinn Bhreagh estate until her death in 2006
- Historic Buildings in Baddeck, Nova Scotia
- History of Baddeck
- Index of Alexander Graham Bell related articles
- Victoria County, Nova Scotia
