= Anthony C. White =

American electrical engineer

Anthony C. White was an American electrical engineer who improved the carbon microphone (then called transmitters) for use with telephones manufactured by the Bell Telephone Company.

The White transmitter was known as the "solid back" transmitter from the heavy metal strap across the back of the unit that supported the rear of a carbon chamber. In the carbon chamber were carbon granules loosely pressed against a carbon button in front. The button was screwed to a mica diaphragm. The White design produced a stronger voice signal than the Hunnings "long distance" transmitter and became the standard transmitter on the "candlestick telephone".

== See also ==
- Invention of the telephone
