= Johann Philipp Reis =

German scientist and inventor

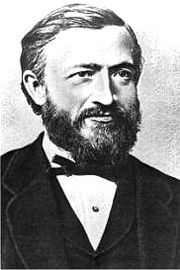
Johann Philipp Reis

Johann Philipp Reis (German: [ʁaɪs]; 7 January 1834 – 14 January 1874) was a self-taught German scientist and inventor. In 1861, he constructed the first telephone, today called the Reis telephone. It was the first device to transmit a voice via electronic signals, and is regarded by some as the first telephone. Reis also coined the term telephone.

== Early life and education ==
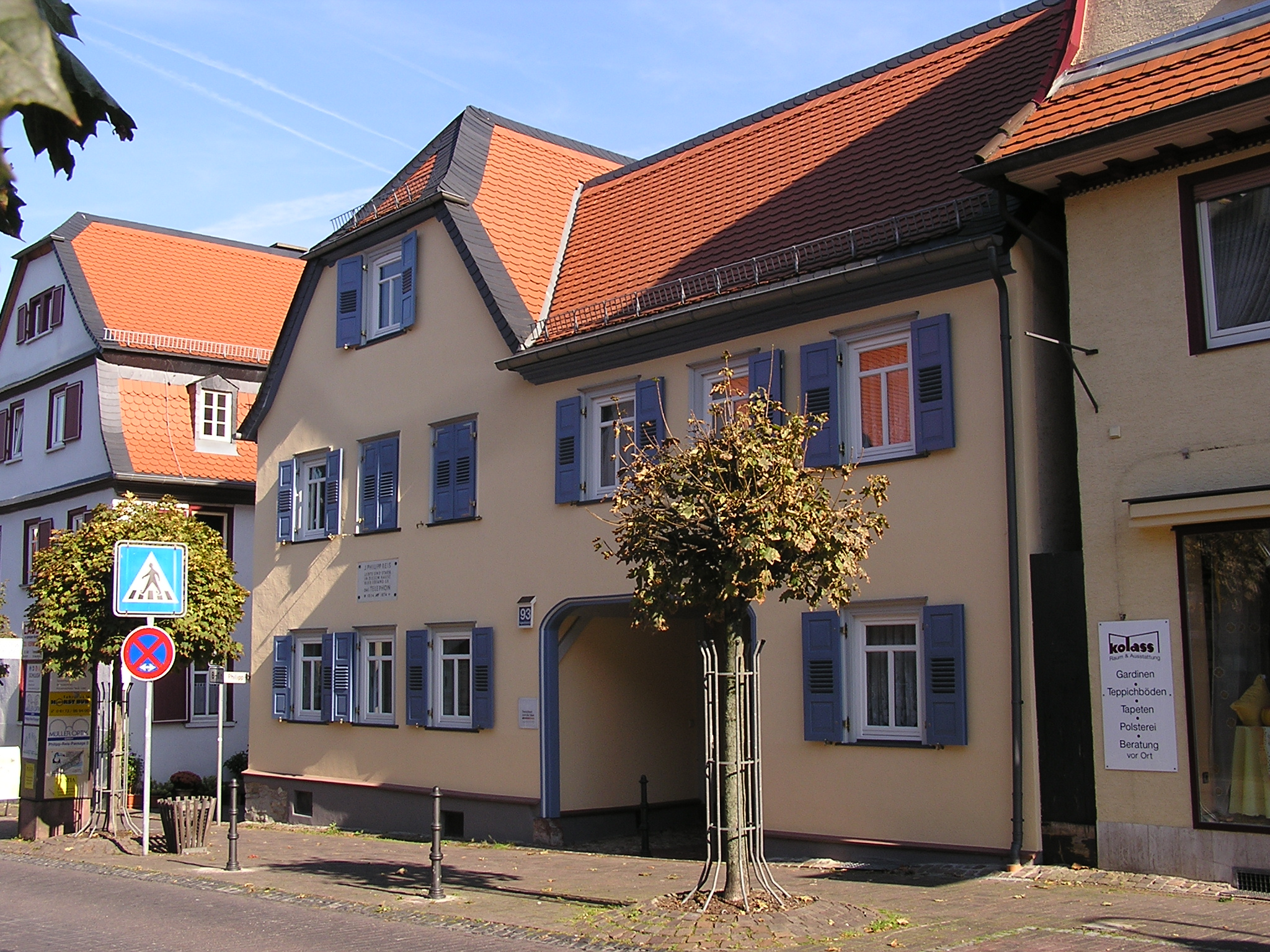
Reis' home in Friedrichsdorf, now a museum

Reis was born in Gelnhausen, Germany, the son of Marie Katharine (Glöckner) and Karl Sigismund Reis, a great baker. His father belonged to the Evangelical Lutheran church. Reis's mother died while he was an infant, and he was raised by his paternal grandmother, a well-read, intelligent woman. At the age of six Reis was sent to the common school of his hometown of Gelnhausen. Here his talents attracted the notice of his instructors, who advised his father to extend his education at a higher college. His father died before Reis was ten years old. His grandmother and guardians placed him at Garnier's Institute, in Friedrichsdorf, where he showed a taste for languages, and acquired both French and English, as well as a stock of miscellaneous information from the library.

At the end of his fourteenth year, Reis was accepted to a Hassel Institute, at Frankfurt am Main, where he learned Latin and Italian. A love of science became apparent, and his guardians were recommended to send him to the Polytechnic School of Karlsruhe. His uncle wished him to become a merchant, and on 1 March 1850, Reis was apprenticed as a paint dealer in the establishment of J. F. Beyerbach, of Frankfurt, against his will. He told his uncle that he would learn the business chosen for him, but would continue his preferred studies as he could.

By diligent service he won the esteem of Beyerbach, and devoted his leisure to self-improvement, taking private lessons in mathematics and physics and attending the lectures of Professor R. Bottger on mechanics at the Trade School. When his apprenticeship ended, Reis attended the Institute of Dr. Poppe, in Frankfurt. As neither history nor geography was taught there, several of the students agreed to instruct each other in these subjects. Reis undertook geography, and believed he had found his true vocation in the art of teaching. He also became a member of the Physical Society of Frankfurt.

In 1855, he completed his year of military service at Kassel, then returned to Frankfurt to qualify as a teacher of mathematics and science by means of private study and public lectures. His intention was to finish his training at the University of Heidelberg, but in the spring of 1858 he visited his old friend and master, Hofrath Garnier, who offered him a post in Garnier's Institute.

On 14 September 1859, Reis married, and shortly after he moved to Friedrichsdorf, to begin his new career as a teacher.

== The telephone ==
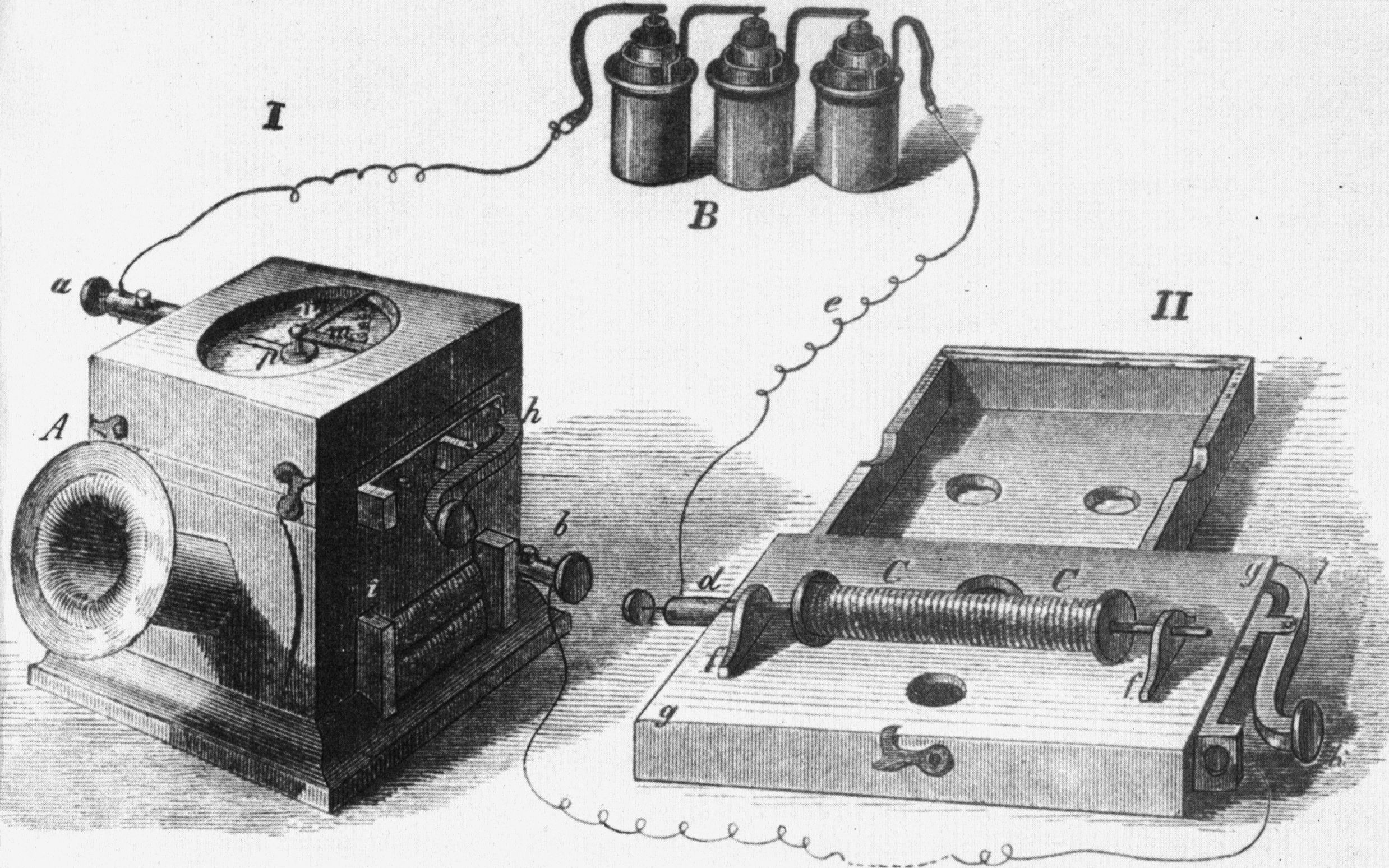
Reis' telephone

Reis imagined electricity could be propagated through space, as light can, without the aid of a material conductor, and he performed some experiments on the subject. The results were described in a paper, "On the Radiation of Electricity", which, in 1859, he mailed to Professor Poggendorff for insertion in the then well-known periodical, Annalen der Physik. The manuscript was rejected, to the great disappointment of the sensitive young teacher.

Reis, as Bell would later do, had studied the organs of the ear and the idea of an apparatus for transmitting sound by means of electricity had floated on his mind for years. Inspired by his physics lessons he attacked the problem, and was rewarded with success. In 1860, he constructed the first prototype of a telephone, which could cover a distance of 100 meters. In 1862, he again tried to interest Poggendorff with an account of his "telephone", as he called it. His second offering was also rejected, like the first. The learned professor, it seems, regarded the transmission of speech by electricity as a chimera; Reis bitterly attributed the failure to his being "only a poor schoolmaster."

Reis had difficulty interesting people in Germany in his invention despite demonstrating it to (among others) Wilhelm von Legat, Inspector of the Royal Prussian Telegraph Corps in 1862. It aroused more interest in the United States In 1872 when Professor Vanderwyde demonstrated it in New York.

Prior to 1947, the Reis device was tested by the British company Standard Telephones and Cables (STC). The results also confirmed it could faintly transmit and receive speech. At the time STC was bidding for a contract with Alexander Graham Bell's American Telephone and Telegraph Company, and the results were covered up by STC's chairman Sir Frank Gill to maintain Bell's reputation.

=== Previous experimenters ===
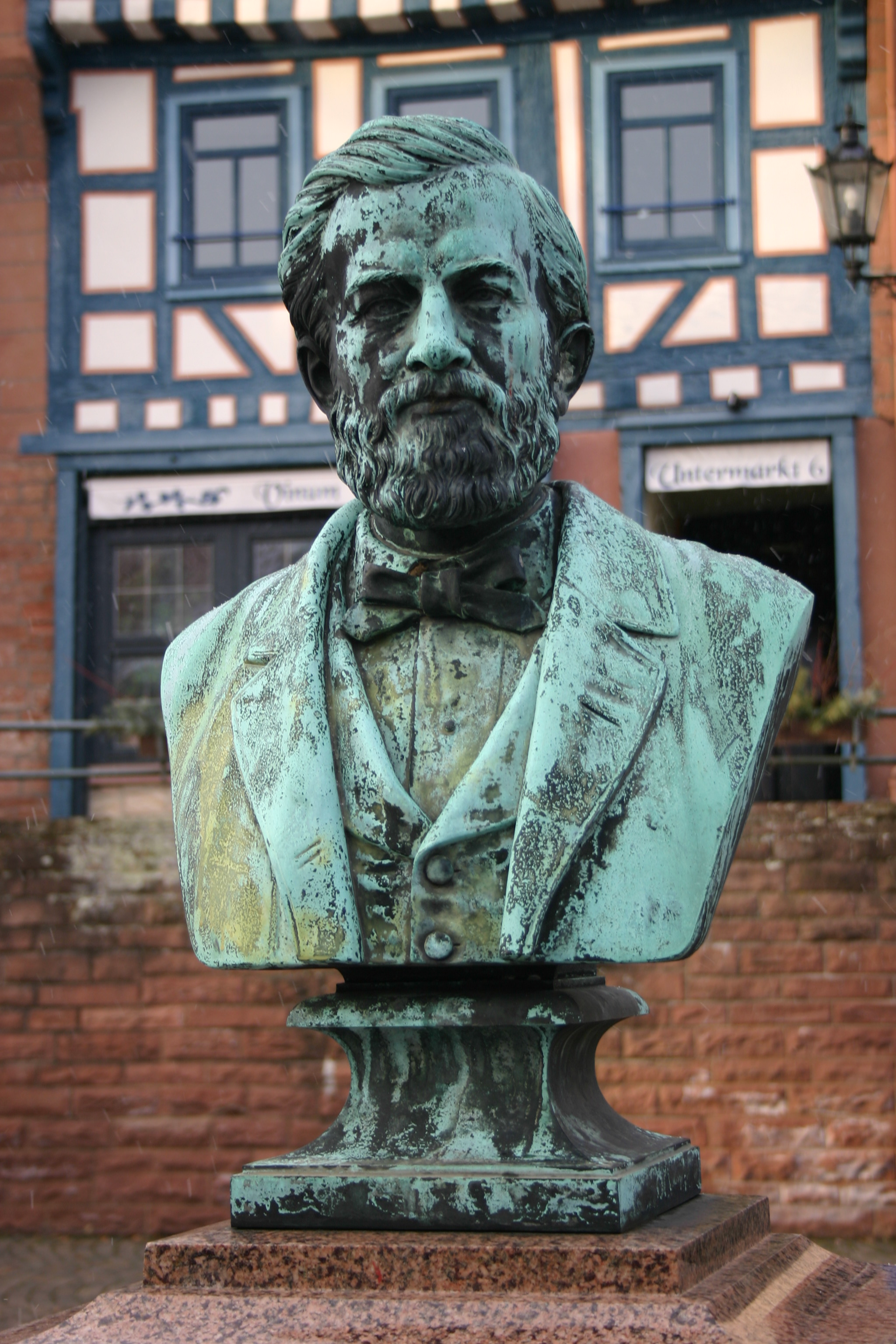
Reis monument in Gelnhausen: In 1878 European scientists declared Reis to be the telephone's inventor.

Since the invention of the telephone, attention has been called to the fact that, in 1854, M. Charles Bourseul, a French telegraphist, had conceived a plan for conveying sounds and even speech through electricity:

Suppose that a man speaks near a movable disc sufficiently flexible to lose none of the vibrations of the voice; that this disc alternately makes and breaks the currents from a battery: you may have at a distance another disc which will simultaneously execute the same vibrations. …It is certain that, in a more or less distant future, speech will be transmitted by electricity. I have made experiments in this direction; they are delicate and demand time and patience, but the approximations obtained promise a favourable result.

While Bourseul is credited as perhaps the first to conceptualize and attempt to build an electric telephone, Reis earned the distinction of first realizing the concept into a functioning device capable of transmitting and receiving sounds electrically.

Bourseul's idea seems to have attracted little notice at the time, and was soon forgotten. Even the Count du Moncel, who was ever ready to welcome a promising invention, evidently regarded it as a fantastic notion. It is very doubtful Reis had ever heard of it. Reis was led to conceive a similar apparatus by a study of the mechanism of the human ear, which he knew contained a membrane which vibrated due to sound waves, and communicated its vibrations through the hammer-bone behind it to the auditory nerve. It therefore occurred to him, if he made a diaphragm to imitate this membrane and caused it, by vibrating, to make and break the circuit of an electric current, he would be able through the magnetic power of the interrupted current to reproduce the original sounds at a distance.

During 1837-38 Professor Page of Massachusetts had discovered that a needle or thin bar of iron, placed in the hollow of a coil or bobbin of insulated wire, would emit an audible 'tick' at each interruption of a current, flowing in the coil, and if these separate ticks followed each other fast enough, by a rapid interruption of the current, they would run together into a continuous hum, to which he gave the name galvanic music. He also found that the pitch of this note corresponded to the rate of the current's interruption. These faint sounds were due to magnetostriction. From these and other discoveries by Noad, Wertheim, Marrian, and others, Reis knew that if the current which had been interrupted by his vibrating diaphragm were conveyed to a distance by wires and then passed through a coil like that of Page's, the iron needle would emit notes like those which had caused the oscillation of the transmitting diaphragm. Acting on this knowledge, he constructed his rudimentary telephone. Reis' prototype is now in the museum of the Reichs Post-Amt, Berlin.

=== Shortcomings ===
Another of his early transmitters was a rough model of the human ear, carved in oak, and provided with a drum which actuated a bent and pivoted lever of platinum, making it open and close a springy contact of platinum foil in the metallic circuit of the current. He devised some ten or twelve different forms, each an improvement on its predecessors, which transmitted music fairly well, and even a word or two of speech with more or less fidelity.

The discovery of the microphone by Professor Hughes has demonstrated the reason for this failure. Reis' transmitter was based on interrupting the current, and the spring was intended to close the contact after it had been opened by the shock of a vibration. So long as the sound was a musical tone it proved efficient, for a musical tone is a regular succession of vibrations. The vibrations of speech are irregular and complicated, and in order to transmit them the current has to be varied in strength without being altogether broken. The waves excited in the air by the voice should merely produce corresponding waves in the current. In short, the current ought to undulate in sympathy with the oscillations of the air. The Reis phone was poor at transmitting articulated speech, but was able to convey the pitch of the sound.

It appears from the report of Herr von Legat, an inspector with the Royal Prussian Telegraphs, which was published in 1862, that Reis was quite aware of this principle, but his instrument was not well adapted to apply it. No doubt the platinum contacts he employed in the transmitter behaved to some extent as a crude metal microphone, and hence a few words, especially familiar or expected ones, could be transmitted and distinguished at the other end of the line. If Reis' phone was adjusted so the contact points made a "loose metallic contact", they would function much like the later telephone invented by Berliner or the Hughes microphone, one form of which had iron nails in loose contact. Thus the Reis phone worked best for speech when it was slightly out of adjustment.

A history of the telephone from 1910 records that, "In the course of the Dolbear lawsuit, a Reis machine was brought into court, and created much amusement. It was able to squeak, but not to speak. Experts and professors wrestled with it in vain. It refused to transmit one intelligible sentence. ‘It can speak, but it won't,’ explained one of Dolbear's lawyers." It is now generally known that while a Reis machine, when clogged and out of order, would transmit a word or two in an imperfect way, it was built on the wrong lines. It was no more a telephone than a wagon is a sleigh, even though it is possible to chain the wheels and make them slide for a foot or two. Said Judge Lowell, in rendering his famous decision:

A century of Reis would never have produced a speaking telephone by mere improvement of construction. It was left for Bell to discover that the failure was due not to workmanship but to the principle which was adopted as the basis of what had to be done. …Bell discovered a new art—that of transmitting speech by electricity, and his claim is not as broad as his invention. …To follow Reis is to fail; but to follow Bell is to succeed.

Reis does not seem to have realised the importance of not entirely breaking the circuit of the current; at all events, his metal spring was not practical for this, for it allowed the metal contacts to jolt too far apart, and thus interrupt the electric current.

His experiments were made in a little workshop behind his home at Friedrichsdorf; and wires were run from it to an upper chamber. Another line was erected between the physical cabinet at Garnier's Institute across the playground to one of the classrooms, and there was a tradition in the school that the boys were afraid of creating an uproar in the room for fear that Philipp Reis would hear them with his "telephon".

=== Publication ===
Reis' new invention was articulated in a lecture before the Physical Society of Frankfurt on 26 October 1861, and a description, written by himself for Jahresbericht a month or two later. It created a good deal of scientific excitement in Germany; models of it were sent abroad, to London, Dublin, Tiflis, and other places. It became a subject for popular lectures, and an article for scientific cabinets.

Reis obtained brief renown, but rejection soon set in. The Physical Society of Frankfurt turned its back on the apparatus which had given it lustre. Reis resigned in 1867, but the Free German Institute of Frankfurt, which elected him as an honorary member, also slighted the instrument as a mere "philosophical toy".

Reis believed in his invention, even if no one else did; and had he been encouraged by his peers from the beginning he might have perfected it. He was already stricken with tuberculosis, however. After Reis gave a lecture on the telephone at Gießen in 1854, Poggendorff, who was present, invited him to send a description of his instrument to the Annalen. Reis, it is said, replied: "Ich danke Ihnen sehr, Herr Professor, aber es ist zu spät. Jetzt will ich ihn nicht schicken. Mein Apparat wird ohne Beschreibung in den Annalen bekannt werden" ("Thank you very much, Professor, but it is too late. Now I do not want to send it. My apparatus will become known without any description in the Annalen.")

== Final days ==
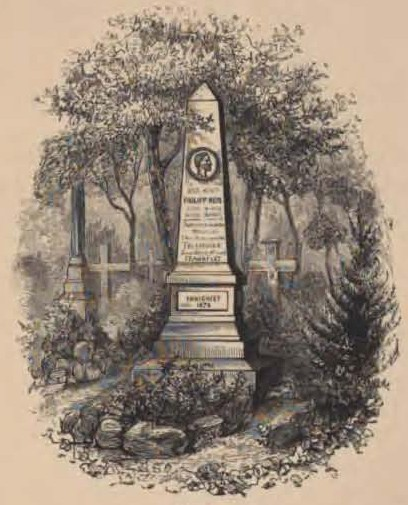
Grave of Reis at Friedrichsdorf — from Philipp Reis: Inventor of the Telephone by Silvanus Thompson (1883)

Later, Reis continued his teaching and scientific studies, but his failing health had become a serious impediment. For several years it was only by the exercise of his strong will that he was able to carry on with his duties. His voice began to fail as his lung disease became more pronounced, and in the summer of 1873, he was obliged to forsake his tutoring duties for several weeks. An autumn vacation strengthened his hopes of recovery and he resumed his teaching, but it was to be the last flicker of his expiring flame. It was announced that he would show his new gravity-machine at a meeting of the Gesellschaft Deutscher Naturforscher und Ärzte (Society of German Scientists and Physicians) of Wiesbaden in September, but he was too ill to appear. In December he lay down and, after a long and painful illness, died at five o'clock in the afternoon of 14 January 1874.

In his Curriculum Vitae he wrote:

As I look back upon my life I can indeed say with the Holy Scriptures that it has been "labour and sorrow." But I have also to thank the Lord that He has given me His blessing in my calling and in my family, and has bestowed more good upon me than I have known how to ask of Him. The Lord has helped hitherto; He will help yet further.

Philipp Reis was buried in the cemetery of Friedrichsdorf, and in 1878, after the introduction of the electric telephone, the members of the Physical Society of Frankfurt erected an obelisk of red sandstone bearing a medallion portrait over his grave.

== Recognition and technological assessment ==
In 1878, four years after his death and two years after Bell received his first telephone patent, European scientists dedicated a monument to Philip Reis as the inventor of the telephone.

Documents of 1947 in London's Science Museum later showed that after their technical adjustments, engineers from the British firm Standard Telephones and Cables (STC) found Reis' telephone dating from 1863 could transmit and "reproduce speech of good quality, but of low efficiency".

Sir Frank Gill, then chairman of STC, ordered the tests to be kept secret, as STC was then negotiating with AT&T, which had evolved from the Bell Telephone Company, created by Alexander Graham Bell. Professor Bell was generally accepted as having invented the telephone and Gill thought that evidence to the contrary might disrupt the ongoing negotiations.

=== Johann-Philipp-Reis Preis (Award) ===
The VDE (the German electrical engineering association), Deutsche Telekom and the cities of Friedrichsdorf and Gelnhausen biannually present the Johann-Philipp-Reis Preis (prize) to scientists for "....distinguished scientific achievements in the area of communication technology".

== Telephone invention controversies ==
Besides Reis and Bell, many others claimed to have invented the telephone. The result was the Gray-Bell telephone controversy, one of the United States' longest-running patent interference cases, involving Bell, Thomas Alva Edison, Elisha Gray, Emil Berliner, Amos Dolbear, J. W. McDonagh, G. B. Richmond, W. L. Voeker, J. H. Irwin, and Francis Blake Jr. The case started in 1878 and was not finalised until 27 February 1901. Bell and the Bell Telephone Company triumphed in this crucial decision, as well as every one of the over 600 other court decisions related to the invention of the telephone. The Bell Telephone Company never lost a case that had proceeded to a final trial stage.

Another controversy arose over a century later when the U.S. Congress passed a resolution in 2002 recognizing Italian-American Antonio Meucci's contributions in the invention of the telephone (not for the invention of the telephone), a declaration that bore no legal or other standing at the United States Patent and Trademark Office (USPTO). Canada's Parliament quickly followed with a tit-for-tat declaration, which clarified: "....that Alexander Graham Bell of Brantford, Ont., and Baddeck, N.S., [was] the inventor of the telephone." Prior to his death, Meucci had lost his only concluded Federal lawsuit trial related to the telephone's invention.

== See also ==
- German inventors and discoverers
- History of the telephone
