= Charles Bourseul =

French inventor

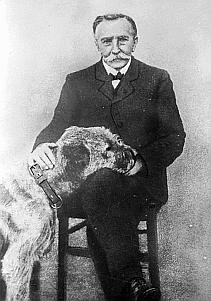
Charles Bourseul, c.1890

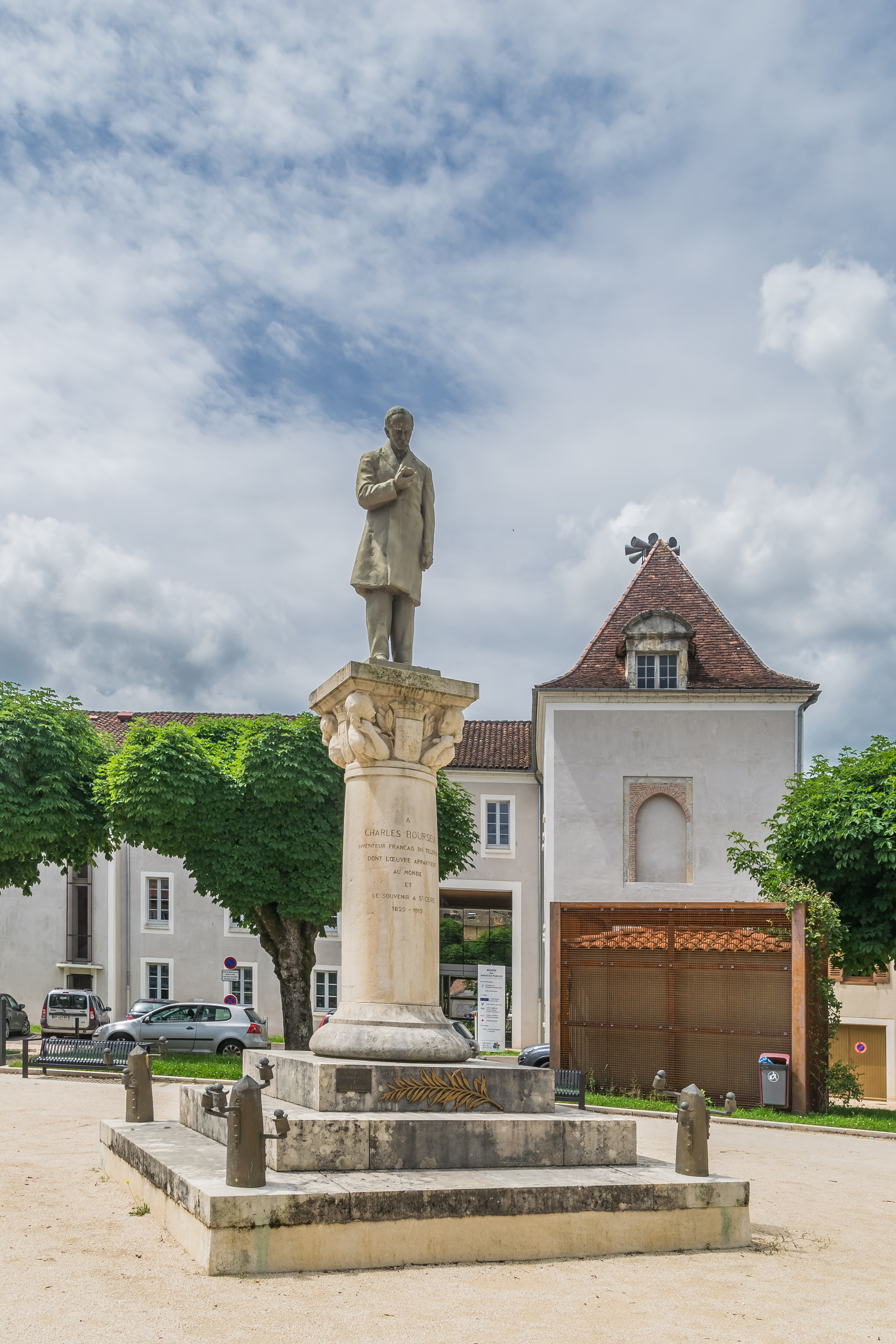
Statue of Charles Bourseul in Saint-Céré

Charles Bourseul (28 April 1829 – 23 November 1912) was a pioneer in development of the "make and break" telephone about 20 years before Bell made a practical telephone.

== Life ==
Bourseul was born in Brussels, Belgium, and grew up in Douai, France. His father was a French army officer. Charles worked for the telegraph company as a civil engineer and mechanic. He made improvements to the telegraph system of L. F. Breguet (a French instrument maker) and Samuel F. B. Morse. Charles Bourseul experimented with the electrical transmission of the human voice and developed an electromagnetic microphone, but his telephone receiver was unable to convert electric current back into clear human voice sounds.

== On the telephone ==
In 1854 Bourseul wrote a memorandum on the transmission of the human voice by electric currents that was first published in a magazine L'Illustration (Paris), though no prototype was built. That is about the same time that Antonio Meucci later claimed to have created his first attempt at the telephone in the United States of America.

Bourseul explained:

“Suppose a man talks near a moving disc that is flexible enough not to lose any of the vibrations of the voice, and that this disc periodically interrupts the current of a battery; then, at a certain distance, we could have another disc that simultaneously executes the same vibrations. The passage of an electric current through a metal wire transforms into a magnet a piece of soft iron placed in the vicinity of the wire. As soon as the current stops, the soft iron is demagnetized. This magnet, the electromagnet, can thus alternatively attract or repel a metal plate. It would be perfectly possible to arrange this second metal plate, so as to make it repeat the same vibrations as the first; this result would be exactly the same as if the person had spoken in the immediate vicinity against this second plate. In other words, the ear would be affected, as if the sounds had reached it directly through the first metal disc. [...] It is certain that, in a more or less distant future, speech will be transmitted by electricity. I have made experiments in this direction; they are delicate and demand time and patience, but the approximations obtained promise a favourable result.”

== Death ==
Bourseul died in Saint-Céré, France, at the age of 83.

== See also ==
- Johann Philipp Reis
- Alexander Graham Bell
- Antonio Meucci
- Invention of the telephone

== Bibliography ==
- History of Telecommunications 1874-1930
- (fr) Charles Bourseul, « Transmission électrique de la parole », L'Illustration, 26.08.1854.
- (fr) G. Babin, « Le téléphone, invention française », L'Illustration, 21 novembre 1908.
- (fr) R. Camboulives, « Un Occitan d'adoption : Charles Bourseul, inventeur du téléphone ». Communication faite à l'Académie des Sciences, Inscriptions et Belles-Lettres de Toulouse dans sa séance du 8 novembre 1978.
