= Francis Blake (inventor) =

American engineer

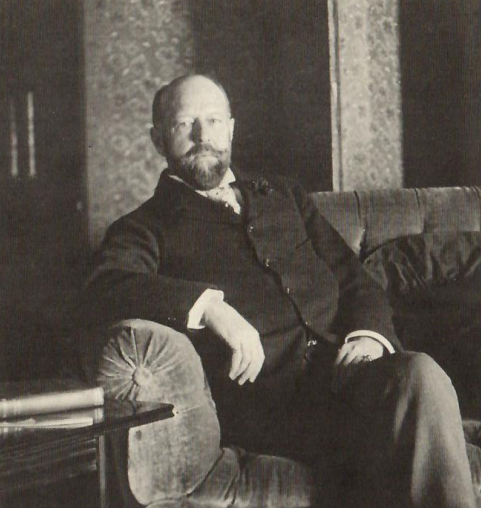
- Born: December 25, 1850; Needham, Massachusetts
- Died: January 20, 1913 (aged 62); Weston, Massachusetts
- Occupation: Inventor
- Spouse: Elizabeth Livermore Hubbard (m. 1874)

Francis Blake Jr. (December 25, 1850 – January 20, 1913) was an American inventor.

== Biography ==
Francis Blake was born in Needham, Massachusetts on December 25, 1850, the son of Caroline Burling (Trumbull) and Francis Blake, Sr.

In 1879, he invented a carbon microphone for use in the telephone, and patented it shortly after Thomas Edison invented a similar microphone that also used carbon contacts. Blake used a carbon button design that initially would not stay in adjustment, but with later improvements proved to be workable. Alexander Graham Bell hired Blake and put him to work with Emile Berliner who also invented a carbon microphone. The improved Berliner-Blake microphone was standard with the Bell company for many years. Blake also improved the construction of the microtome, and photographic shutter.

Blake worked on the United States Coast Survey from his teenage years through early adulthood (1866-1878). He was a physicist and an amateur photographer.

In 1874, Blake married Elizabeth Livermore Hubbard (1849-1941) whose father provided land in Weston, on which Blake designed and built an elaborate house where he conducted his electrical experiments. They had two children: Agnes (Blake) Fitzgerald (b. 1876) and Benjamin Sewall Blake (b. 1877).

Blake was elected a member of the American Antiquarian Society in 1900.

He died at his home in Boston on January 20, 1913.

== Patents ==
- Canadian patent 10021 for telephone transmitter, granted May 28, 1879, voided March 3, 1887 because of failure to manufacture telephone parts in Canada.
- US patent granted in 1881
