= Henry Hunnings =

Henry Hunnings (25 July 1842 – 4 May 1886) was a British clergyman and inventor.

Born in Tottenham on 25 July 1842, Henry Hunnings worked as a printer and photographer at the family business on High Road, Tottenham. In 1864 Hunnings took the photo of Hare Pomare (Ref: PA2-0924 Portrait of Hare Pomare, c/o Alexander Turnbull Library, Wellington, New Zealand) whilst the Māori party were staying with Elizabeth Fairburn Colenso.

In January 1868, aged 25, Hunnings left the family business and became a student at St Edmund Hall, Oxford. In 1870 he obtained a BA and joined the clergy (in 1874 he obtained an MA) and between 1874 and 1880 he was a curate at All Saints' Church, Bolton Percy, near York.

During this time Henry created his own telephone transmitter device, which he patented in the UK on 16 September 1878 and in the US on 30 August 1881.

The Hunnings transmitter was a great success, the secret being the use of carbon granules behind the diaphragm and this produced a clearer, stronger voice signal than any other at that time. It would be used around the world for generations and was only phased out by the British GPO in the 1980s.

It was also at Bolton Percy where Henry met Margaret Ann Ridley. Margaret lived with her family in one of the cottages adjacent to the Church and in 1880 at the ages of 37 and 19 respectively Henry and Margaret were married. They subsequently had two children together; William Butters and Katherine Mary.

Henry left Bolton Percy with his family in 1880 taking other Curate’s positions in Rothwell (Leeds), Ryde (Isle of Wight) and Eling (Hampshire) before securing his final role in November 1885 as Chaplain of Royal South Hants Infirmary. However, by this time he was in poor health and in fear of losing his job he killed himself on 4 May 1886.

The post mortem held later that month gave a verdict of "Suicide in an unsound state of mind". On his death Henry left an estate valued at £1222, 12s, 6d.
