= Carbon microphone =

Microphone design

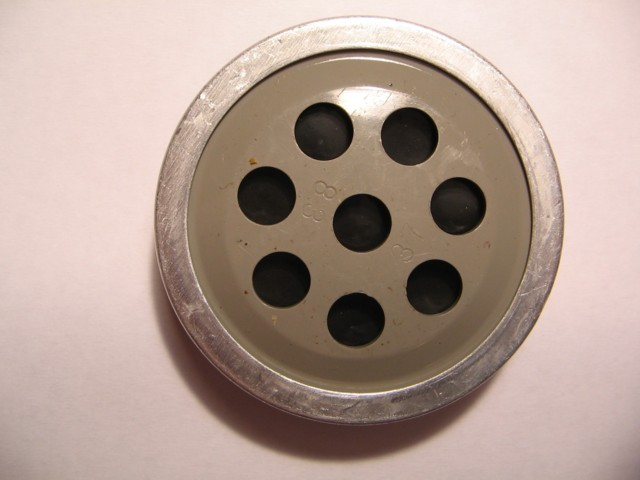
Carbon microphone from Western Electric telephone handset, around 1976

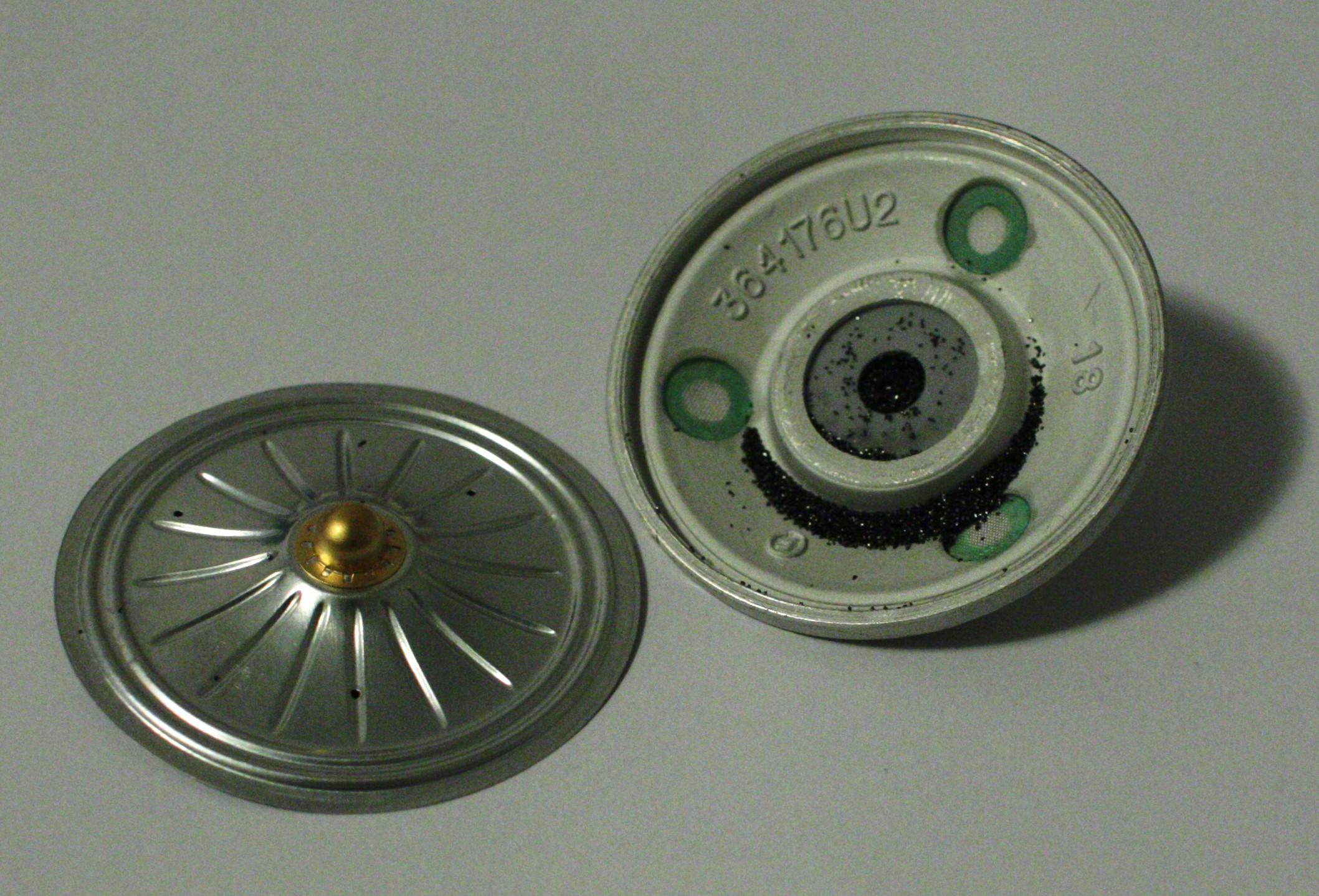
A disassembled Ericsson carbon microphone with carbon particles visible

The carbon microphone, also known as carbon button microphone, button microphone, or carbon transmitter, is a type of microphone, a transducer that converts sound to an electrical audio signal. It consists of two metal plates separated by granules of carbon. One plate is very thin and faces toward the speaking person, acting as a diaphragm. Sound waves striking the diaphragm cause it to vibrate, exerting a varying pressure on the granules, which in turn changes the electrical resistance between the plates. Higher pressure lowers the resistance as the granules are pushed closer together. A steady direct current is passed between the plates through the granules. The varying resistance results in a modulation of the current, creating a varying electric current that reproduces the varying pressure of the sound wave. In analogue telephony, this undulating current is directly passed through the telephone wires to a telephone exchange, and is routed to a recipient. In public address systems it is amplified by an audio amplifier. The frequency response of most carbon microphones, however, is limited to a narrow range, and the device produces significant electrical noise.

It's response increase with sound pressure level. This emphasizes nearby sound while deemphasizing things such as background noise, making it desirable for use in telephones.

Before the proliferation of vacuum tube amplifiers in the 1920s, carbon microphones were the only practical means of obtaining high-level audio signals. They were widely used in telephone systems until the 1980s, while other applications used different microphone designs much earlier. Their low cost, inherently high output and frequency response characteristic were well suited for telephony. For plain old telephone service (POTS), carbon-microphone based telephones can still be used without modification. Carbon microphones, usually modified telephone transmitters, were widely used in early AM radio broadcasting systems, but their limited frequency response, as well as a fairly high noise level, led to their abandonment in those applications by the late 1920s. They continued to be widely used for low-end public address, and military and amateur radio applications for some decades afterward.

== History ==
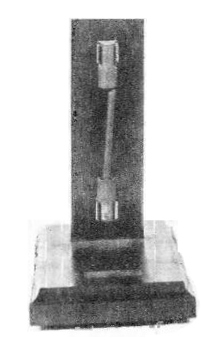
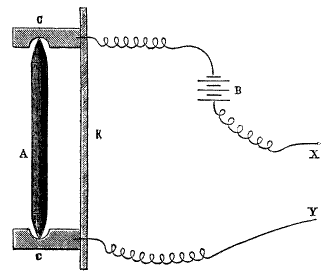
Hughes first carbon microphone, consisting of a carbon bar suspended loosely between two metal contacts with current from a battery passing through. The sound waves vibrated the bar, varying the resistance of the carbon contact points, varying the current.

The first microphone that enabled proper voice telephony was the (loose-contact) carbon microphone (then called transmitter). This was independently developed around 1878 by David Edward Hughes in England and Emile Berliner and Thomas Edison in the US. Although Edison was awarded the first patent in mid-1877, Hughes had demonstrated his working device in front of many witnesses some years earlier, and most historians credit him with its invention.

Hughes' device used loosely packed carbon granules - the varying pressure exerted on the granules by the diaphragm from the acoustic waves caused the resistance of the carbon to vary proportionally, allowing a relatively accurate electrical reproduction of the sound signal. Hughes also coined the word microphone. He demonstrated his apparatus to the Royal Society by magnifying the sound of insects scratching through a sound box. Contrary to Edison, Hughes decided not to take out a patent; instead, he made his invention a gift to the world.

In America, Edison and Berliner fought a long legal battle over the patent rights. Ultimately a federal court awarded Edison full rights to the invention, stating "Edison preceded Berliner in the transmission of speech...The use of carbon in a transmitter is, beyond controversy, the invention of Edison" and the Berliner patent was ruled invalid.

The carbon microphone is the direct prototype of today's microphones and was critical in the development of telephony, broadcasting and the recording industries. Later, carbon granules were used between carbon buttons. Carbon microphones were widely used in telephones from 1890 until the 1980s.

=== Use as amplifier ===
Operation of carbon microphone. When a sound wave presses on the conducting diaphragm, the granules of carbon are pressed together and decrease their electrical resistance.

Carbon microphones can be used as amplifiers. This capability was used in early telephone repeaters, making long-distance phone calls possible in the era before vacuum tube amplifiers. In these repeaters, a magnetic telephone receiver (an electrical-to-mechanical transducer) was mechanically coupled to a carbon microphone. Because a carbon microphone works by varying a current passed through it, instead of generating a signal voltage as with most other microphone types, this arrangement could be used to boost weak signals and send them down the line. These amplifiers were mostly abandoned with the development of vacuum tubes, which offered higher gain and better sound quality. Even after vacuum tubes were in common use, carbon amplifiers continued to be used during the 1930s in portable audio equipment such as hearing aids. The Western Electric 65A carbon amplifier was 1.2" in diameter and 0.4" high and weighed less than 1.4 ounces. Such carbon amplifiers did not require the heavy bulky batteries and power supplies used by vacuum tube amplifiers. By the 1950s, carbon amplifiers for hearing aids had been replaced by miniature vacuum tubes (only to be shortly replaced by transistors). However, carbon amplifiers are still being produced and sold.

An illustration of the amplification provided by carbon microphones was the oscillation caused by feedback, which resulted in an audible squeal from the old "candlestick telephone" if its earphone was placed near the carbon microphone.

=== Early radio applications ===
Early AM radio transmitters relied on carbon microphones for voice modulation of the radio signal. In the first long-distance audio transmissions by Reginald Fessenden in 1906, a continuous wave from an Alexanderson alternator was fed directly to the transmitting antenna through a water-cooled carbon microphone. Later systems using vacuum tube oscillators often used the output from a carbon microphone to modulate the grid bias of the oscillator or output tube to achieve modulation.

== Current usage ==
Apart from legacy telephone installations in various conditions according to areas and countries, carbon microphones may be still used today in certain niche applications although manufacturers are discontinuing distribution.

The principal advantage of carbon microphones over other microphone designs is that they can produce high-level audio signals from very low DC voltages, without needing any form of additional amplification or batteries. The carbon microphone, by virtue of using a power supply, gives a power gain. This can readily be demonstrated by connecting a battery, microphone and earphone in series. If the microphone and earphone are brought in contact the system will oscillate. This is only possible if the power gain around the loop is greater than unity.

The microphone's low-voltage performance is particularly useful in remote locations served by very long telephone lines, where the electrical resistance of the wires can lead to severe DC voltage drop. Most all-electronic telephones need at least three volts DC to work, and so will often become useless in such situations, whereas carbon transmitter telephones will continue to work down to a fraction of a volt. Even where they do work, electronic telephones also suffer from the so-called "cliff effect", whereby they abruptly stop working when the line voltage falls below the critical level. In particular, this means that one telephone on a "party line" may tend to "hog" all the line current, cutting the others off. With carbon microphones, all receivers on the same line will still operate, albeit with reduced output.

Carbon microphones are also widely used in safety-critical applications such as mining and chemical manufacturing, where higher line voltages cannot be used, due to the risk of sparking and consequent explosions. Carbon-based telephone systems are also resistant to damage from high-voltage transients, such as those produced by lightning strikes, and electromagnetic pulses of the type generated by nuclear explosions, and so are still maintained as backup communication systems in critical military installations.

== Bibliography ==
- Josephson, Matthew, Edison: A Biography, Wiley, 1992, ISBN 0-471-54806-5
