= Timeline of the telephone =

This timeline of the telephone covers landline, radio, and cellular telephony technologies and provides many important dates in the history of the telephone.

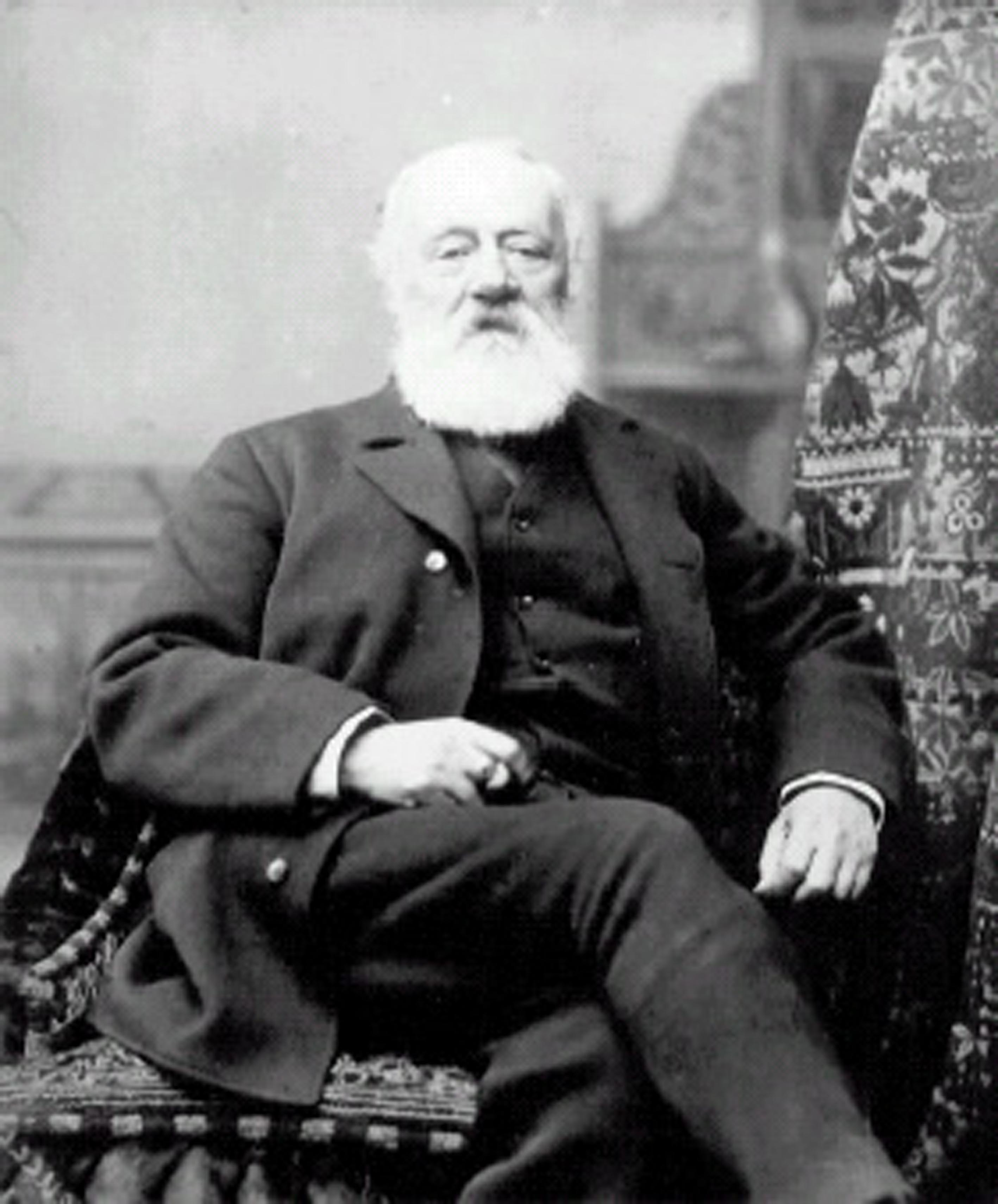
Antonio Meucci

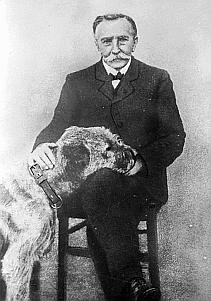
Charles Bourseul

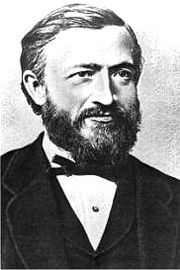
Johann Philipp Reis

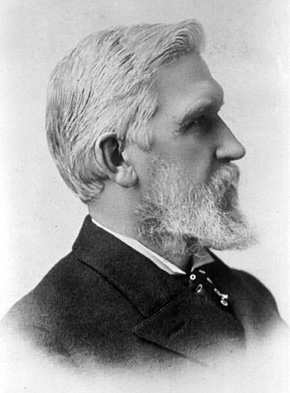
Elisha Gray

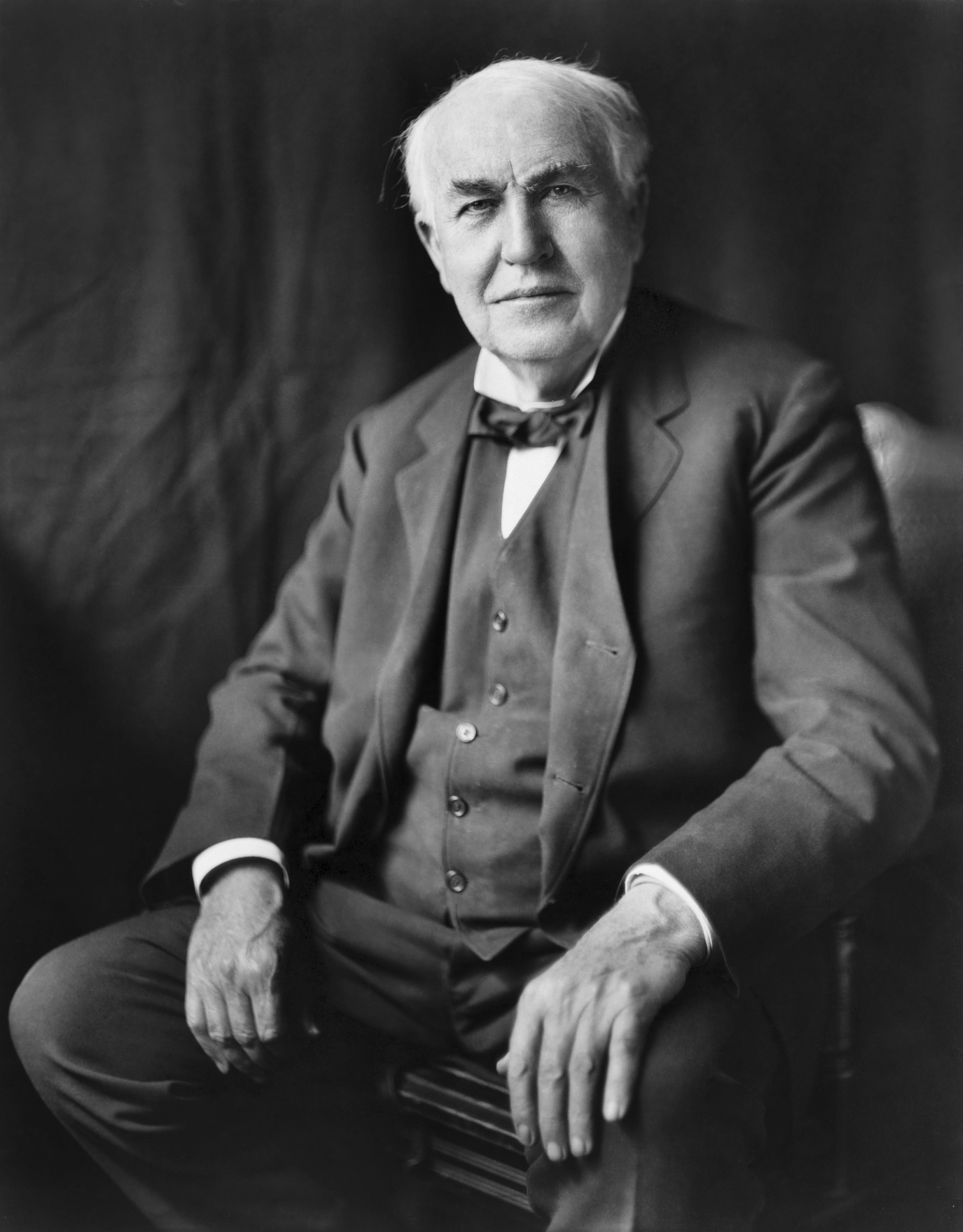
Thomas Edison

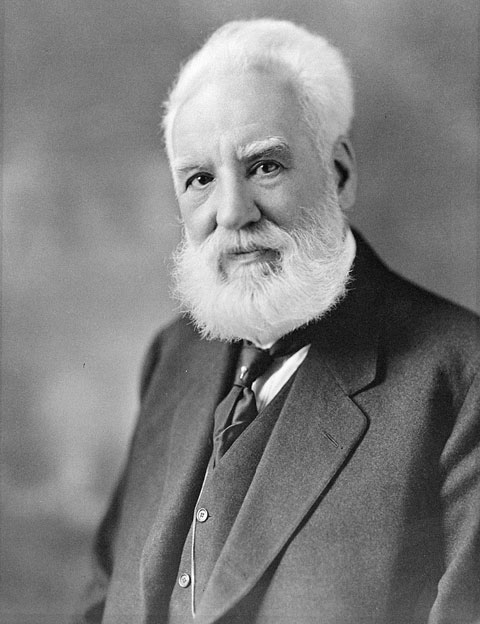
Alexander Graham Bell

Thomas Augustus Watson

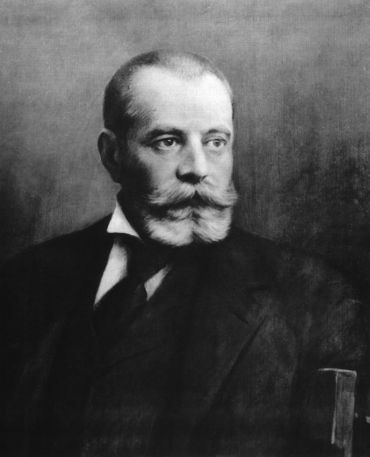
Tivadar Puskás

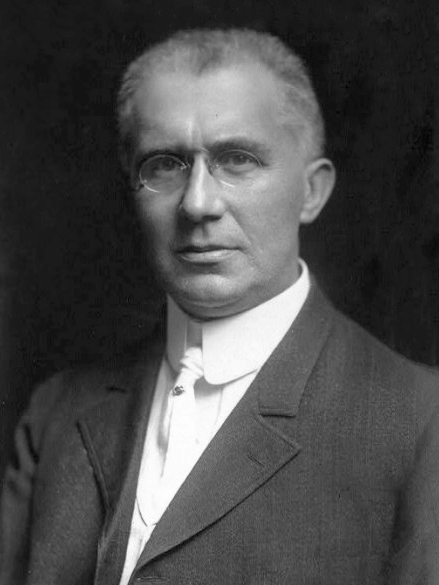
Emile Berliner

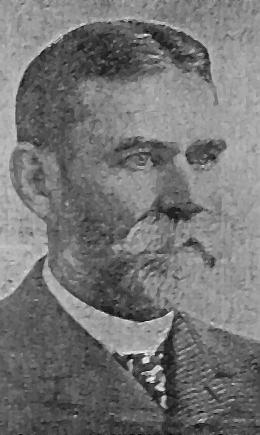
Charles Sumner Tainter

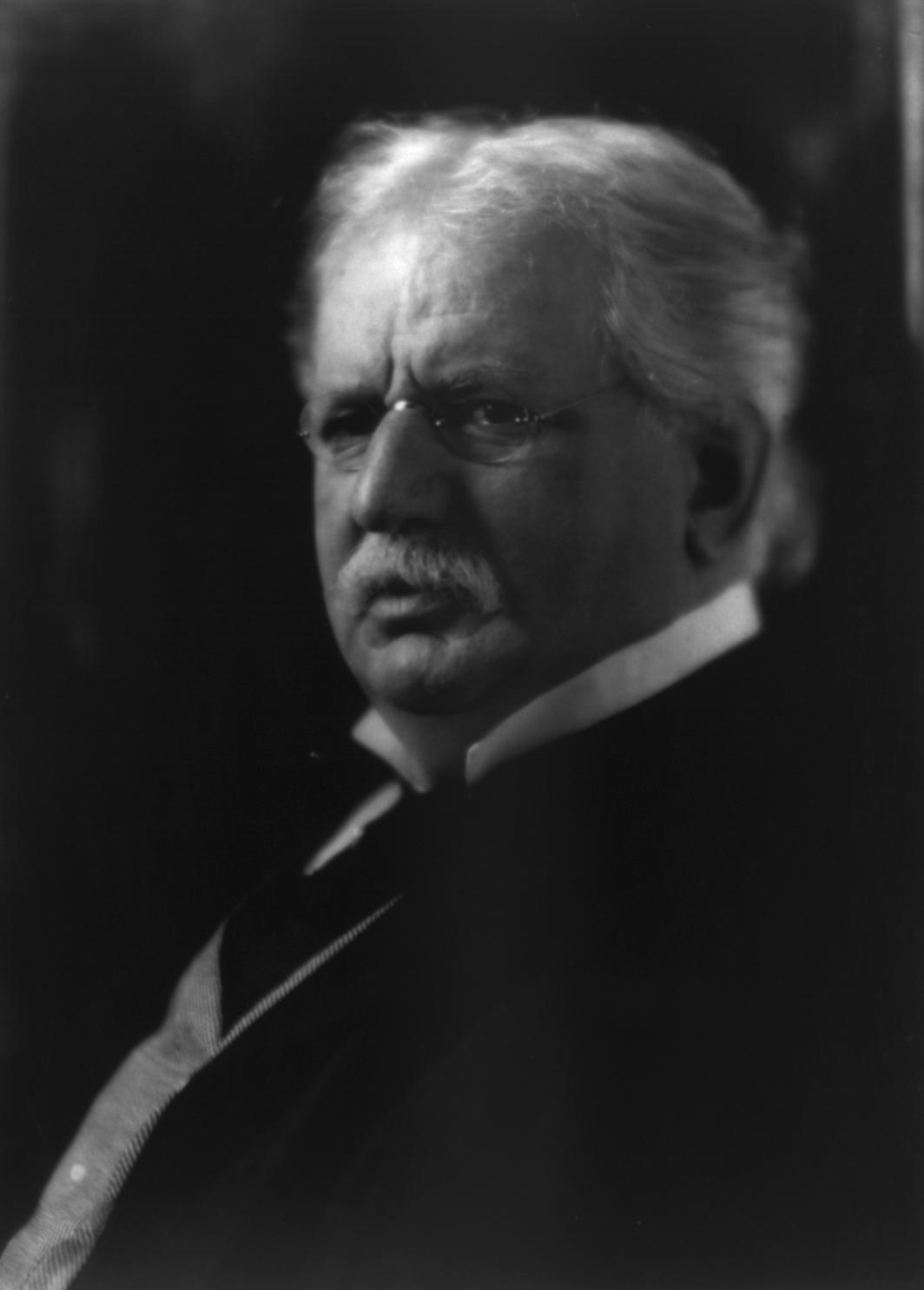
Theodore Newton Vail

== 1667 to 1875 ==
- 1667: Robert Hooke creates an acoustic string telephone that conveys sounds over a taut extended wire by mechanical vibrations.
- 1844: Innocenzo Manzetti first suggests the idea of an electric "speaking telegraph", or telephone.
- 1849: Antonio Meucci developed a voice-communication apparatus that several sources credit as the first telephone.
- 1854: Charles Bourseul publishes a description of a make-and-break telephone transmitter and receiver in L'Illustration, (Paris) but does not construct a working instrument.
- 1854: Meucci demonstrates an electric voice-operated device in New York, but it is not clear what kind of device he demonstrated.
- 1860: Johann Philipp Reis of Germany demonstrates a make-and-break transmitter after the design of Bourseul and a knitting-needle receiver. Witnesses said they heard human voices being transmitted.
- 1861: Johann Philipp Reis transfers voice electrically over a distance of 340 feet with his Reis telephone. To prove that speech can be recognized successfully at the receiving end, he uses the phrase "The horse does not eat cucumber salad" as an example because this phrase is hard to understand acoustically in German.
- 1864: In an attempt to give his musical automaton a voice, Innocenzo Manzetti invents the 'speaking telegraph'. He shows no interest in patenting his device, but it is reported in newspapers.
- 1865: Meucci reads of Manzetti's invention and writes to the editors of two newspapers claiming priority and quoting his first experiment in 1849. He writes "I do not wish to deny Mr. Manzetti his invention, I only wish to observe that two thoughts could be found to contain the same discovery, and that by uniting the two ideas one can more easily reach the certainty about a thing this important."
- 1871: Meucci files a patent caveat (a statement of intention to file a patent application) for a Sound Telegraph, but it does not describe an electromagnetic telephone.
- 1872: Elisha Gray founds the Western Electric Manufacturing Company.
- 1872: Professor Vanderwyde demonstrates Reis's telephone in New York.
- July 1873: Thomas Edison notes varying resistance in carbon grains due to pressure, and builds a rheostat based on the principle but abandons it because of its sensitivity to vibration.
- May 1874: Gray invents an electromagnet device for transmitting musical tones. Some of his receivers use a metallic diaphragm.
- July 1874: Alexander Graham Bell conceives the theoretical concept for the telephone while vacationing at his parents' farm near Brantford, Ontario, Canada. Alexander Melville Bell records notes of his son's conversation in his personal journal.
- 29 December 1874: Gray demonstrates his musical tones device and transmits "familiar melodies through telegraph wire" at the Presbyterian Church in Highland Park, Illinois.
- 4 May 1875: Bell conceives of using varying resistance in a wire conducting electric current to create a varying current amplitude.
- 2 June 1875: Bell transmits the sound of a plucked steel reed using electromagnet instruments.
- 1 July 1875: Bell uses a bi-directional "gallows" telephone that was able to transmit "indistinct but voice-like sounds" rather than clear speech. Both the transmitter and the receiver were identical membrane electromagnet instruments.
- 1875: Thomas Edison experiments with acoustic telegraphy and, in November, builds an electro-dynamic receiver but does not exploit it.

== 1876 to 1878 ==
- 11 February 1876: Elisha Gray invents a liquid transmitter for use with a telephone, but he did not make one.
- 14 February 1876
  - about 9:30 am: Gray or his lawyer brings Gray's patent caveat for the telephone to the Washington, D.C. Patent Office (a caveat was a notice of intention to file a patent application. It was like a patent application, but without a request for examination, for the purpose of notifying the patent office of a possible invention in process).
  - about 11:30 am: Bell's lawyer brings to the same patent office Bell's patent application for the telephone. Bell's lawyer requests that it be registered immediately in the cash receipts blotter.
  - about 1:30 pm: Approximately two hours later Elisha Gray's patent caveat is registered in the cash blotter. Although his caveat was not a full application, Gray could have converted it into a patent application and contested Bell's priority, but did not do so because of advice from his lawyer and his involvement with acoustic telegraphy. The result was that the patent was awarded to Bell.
- 7 March 1876: Bell's U.S. Patent, No. 174,465 for the telephone is granted.
- 10 March 1876: Bell first successfully transmits speech, saying "Mr. Watson, come here! I want to see you!" using a liquid transmitter as described in Gray's caveat, and Bell's own electromagnetic receiver.
- 16 May 1876: Thomas Edison files first patent application for acoustic telegraphy for which U.S. patent 182,996 was granted 10 October 1876.
- 25 June 1876: Bell exhibits his telephone at the Centennial Exposition in Philadelphia, where it draws enthusiastic reactions from Emperor Dom Pedro II of Brazil and Lord Kelvin, attracting the attention of the press and resulting in the first announcements of the invention to the general public. Lord Kelvin describes the telephone as "the greatest by far of all the marvels of the electric telegraph".
- 10 August 1876: Alexander Graham Bell makes the world's first long-distance telephone call, one-way, not reciprocal, over a distance of about 6 miles, between Brantford and Paris, Ontario, Canada.
- 1876: Hungarian Tivadar Puskás invents the telephone switchboard exchange (later working with Edison).
- 9 October 1876: Bell makes the first two-way long-distance telephone call between Cambridge and Boston, Massachusetts.
- October 1876: Edison tests his first carbon microphone.
- 1877: The first experimental telephone exchange in Boston.
- 20 January 1877: Edison "first [succeeds] in transmitting over wires many articulated sentences" using carbon granules as a pressure-sensitive varying resistance under the pressure of a diaphragm.
- 30 January 1877: Bell's U.S. Patent No. 186,787 is granted for an electromagnetic telephone using permanent magnets, iron diaphragms, and a call bell.
- 4 March 1877: Emile Berliner invents a microphone based on "loose contact" between two metal electrodes, an improvement on Reis' Telephone, and in April 1877 files a caveat of an invention in process.
- April 1877: A telephone line connects the workshop of Charles Williams, Jr., located in Boston, to his house in Somerville, Massachusetts, at 109 Court Street in Boston, where Alexander Graham Bell and Thomas Watson had previously experimented with their telephone. The telephones became No. 1 and 2 in the Bell Telephone Company.
- 27 April 1877: Edison files telephone patent applications. U.S. patents (Nos. 474,230, 474,231 and 474,232) were awarded to Edison in 1892 over the competing claims of Alexander Graham Bell, Emile Berliner, Elisha Gray, Amos Dolbear, J.W. McDonagh, G.B. Richmond, W.L.W. Voeker, J.H. Irwin and Francis Blake Jr. Edison's carbon granules transmitter and Bell's electromagnetic receiver are used, with improvements, by the Bell system for many decades thereafter.
- 4 June 1877: Emile Berliner files telephone patent application that includes a carbon microphone transmitter.
- 9 July 1877: The Bell Telephone Company, a common law joint-stock company, is organized by Alexander Graham Bell's future father-in-law Gardiner Greene Hubbard, a lawyer who becomes its first president.
- 6 October 1877: the Scientific American publishes the invention from Bell – at that time still without a ringer.
- 25 October 1877: the article in the Scientific American is discussed at the Telegraphenamt in Berlin
- November 1877: First permanent telephone connection in UK between two business in Manchester using imported Bell instruments.
- 12 November 1877: The first commercial telephone company enters telephone business in Friedrichsberg close to Berlin using the Siemens pipe as ringer and telephone devices built by Siemens.
- 1 December 1877: Western Union enters the telephone business using Edison's superior carbon microphone transmitter.
- 14 January 1878: Bell demonstrates the device to Queen Victoria and gives her an opportunity to try it. Calls are made to Cowes, Southampton and London, the first long-distance calls in the UK. The queen asks to buy the equipment that was used, but Bell offers to make a model specifically for her.
- 28 January 1878: The first commercial North American telephone exchange is opened in New Haven, Connecticut.
- 4 February 1878: Edison demonstrates the telephone between Menlo Park, New Jersey and Philadelphia.
- 14 June 1878: The Telephone Company (Bell's Patents) Ltd. is registered in London. Opened in London on 21 August 1879, it is Europe's first telephone exchange, followed a couple of weeks later by one in Manchester.
- 12 September 1878: the Bell Telephone Company sues Western Union for infringing Bell's patents.
- 1878: The first Australian telephone trials were made between Semaphore and Kapunda (and later Adelaide and Port Adelaide) in South Australia.

== 1879 to 1919 ==
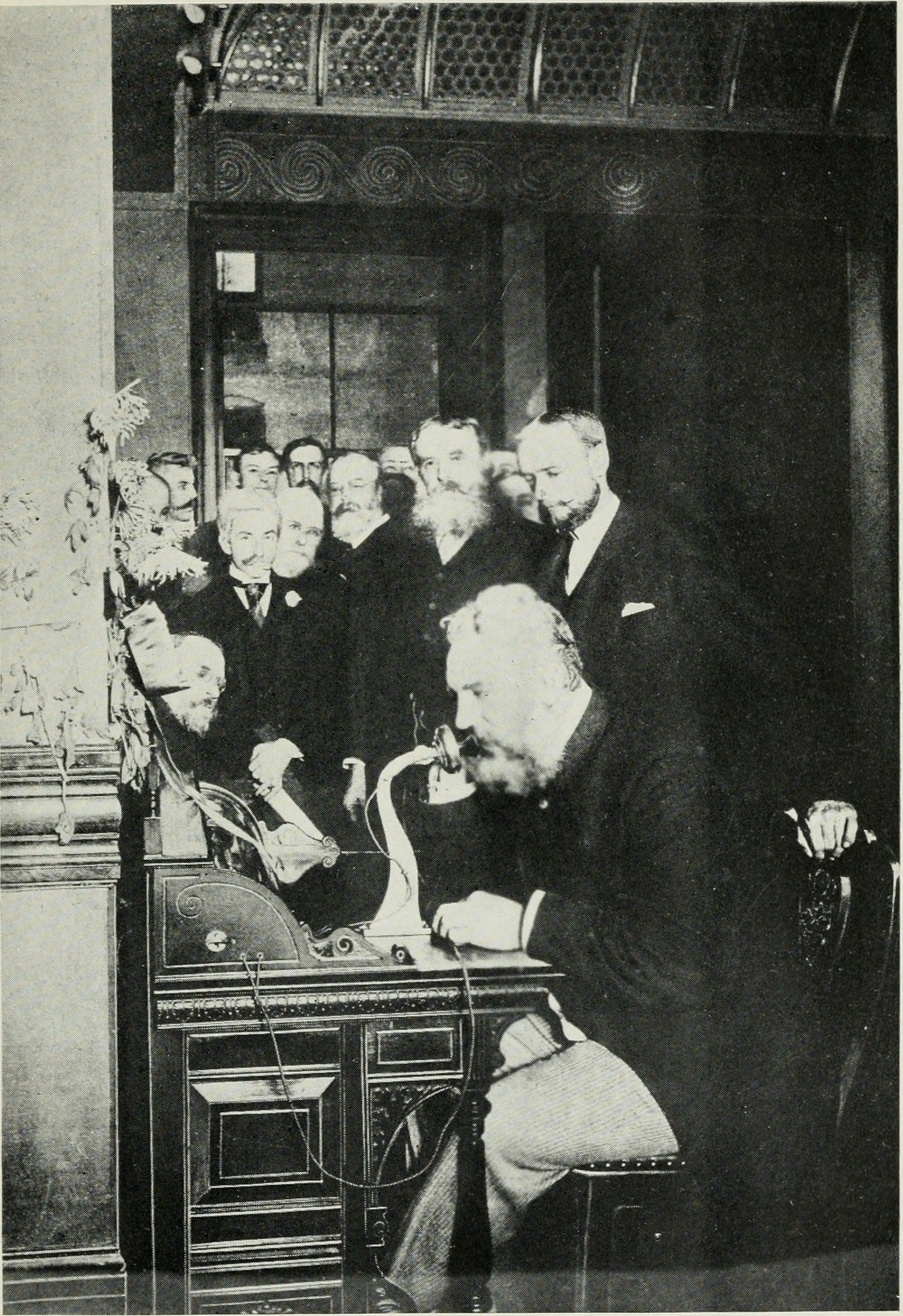
Alexander Graham Bell at the opening of the first New York – Chicago telephone line (October 18, 1892)

- Early months of 1879: The Bell Telephone Company is near bankruptcy and desperate to get a transmitter to equal Edison's carbon transmitter.
- 17 February 1879: Bell Telephone merges with the New England Telephone Company to form the National Bell Telephone Company. Theodore Vail takes over operations.
- 1879: Francis Blake invents a carbon transmitter similar to Edison's that saves the Bell company from extinction.
- 2 August 1879: The Edison Telephone Company London Ltd, registered. Opened in London 6 September 1879.
- 10 September 1879: Connolly and McTighe patent a "dial" telephone exchange (limited in the number of lines to the number of positions on the dial.).
- 1879: The International Bell Telephone Company (IBTC) of Brussels, Belgium was founded by Bell Telephone Company president Gardiner Greene Hubbard, initially to sell imported telephones and switchboards in Continental Europe. International Bell rapidly evolved into an important European telephone service provider and manufacturer, with major operations in several countries.
- 19 February 1880: The photophone, also called a radiophone, is invented jointly by Alexander Graham Bell and Charles Sumner Tainter at Bell's Volta Laboratory. The device allowed for the transmission of sound on a beam of light.
- 20 March 1880: National Bell Telephone merges with others to form the American Bell Telephone Company.
- 1 April 1880: world's first wireless telephone call on Bell and Tainter's photophone (distant precursor to fiber-optic communications) from the Franklin School in Washington, D.C. to the window of Bell's laboratory, 213 meters away.
- 1 July 1881: The world's first international telephone call is made between St. Stephen, New Brunswick, Canada, and Calais, Maine, United States.
- 11 October 1881: The Sydney telephone exchange opened with 12 subscribers.
- 1882: A telephone company—an American Bell Telephone Company affiliate—is set up in Mexico City.
- 14 May 1883: The Adelaide exchange was opened, with 48 subscribers.
- 7 September 1883: The Port Adelaide exchange was opened, with 21 subscribers.
- 4 September 1884: Opening of telephone service between New York and Boston (235 miles).
- 3 March 1885: The American Telephone & Telegraph Company (AT&T) is incorporated as the long-distance division of American Bell Telephone Company. It will become the head of the Bell System on the last day of 1899.
- 1886: Gilliland's Automatic circuit changer is put into service between Worcester and Leicester featuring the first operator dialing allowing one operator to run two exchanges.
- 1887: Tivadar Puskás introduced the multiplex switchboard, that had an epochal significance in the further development of telephone exchange.
- 13 January 1887: the Government of the United States moves to annul the master patent issued to Alexander Graham Bell on the grounds of fraud and misrepresentation. The case, known as the 'Government Case', is later dropped after it was revealed that the U.S. Attorney General, Augustus Hill Garland had been given millions of dollars of stock in the company trying to unseat Bell's telephone patent.
- 1888: Telephone patent court cases are confirmed by the Supreme Court, see The Telephone Cases
- 1889: AT&T becomes the overall holding company for all the Bell companies.
- 2 November 1889: A.G. Smith patents a telegraph switch which provides for trunks between groups of selectors allowing for the first time, fewer trunks than there are lines, and automatic selection of an idle trunk.
- 10 March 1891: Almon Strowger patents the Strowger switch the first Automatic telephone exchange.
- 30 October 1891: The independent Strowger Automatic Telephone Exchange Company is formed.
- 3 May 1892: Thomas Edison awarded patents for the carbon microphone based on applications lodged in 1877.
- 18 October 1892: Opening of telephone service between New York and Chicago (950 miles).
- 3 November 1892: The first Strowger switch goes into operation in LaPorte, Indiana, with 75 subscribers and capacity for 99.
- 30 January 1894: The second fundamental Bell patent for the telephone expires; Independent telephone companies established, and independent manufacturing companies (Stromberg-Carlson in 1894 and Kellogg Switchboard & Supply Company in 1897).
- 30 December 1899: American Bell Telephone Company is purchased by its own long-distance subsidiary, American Telephone and Telegraph (AT&T) to bypass state regulations limiting capitalization. AT&T assumes leadership role of the Bell System.
- 25 December 1900: John W. Atkins, the manager at International Ocean Telegraph Company (IOTC), a subsidiary of Western Union Telegraph Company made the first international telephone call over telegraph cable at 09:55 from his office in Key West to Havana, Cuba. Atkins was reported in the Florida Times Union and Citizen as saying, "For a long time there was no sound, except the roar heard at night sometimes, caused by electric light current." He continued calling Cuba and finally came back the words, clear and distinct: "I don't understand you."
- 27 February 1901: United States Court of Appeal declares void Emile Berliner's patent for a telephone transmitter used by the Bell telephone system
- 1902: The first Australian interstate calls between Mount Gambier and Nelson.
- 26 February 1914: Boston-Washington underground cable commenced commercial service.
- 16 January 1915: The first automatic Panel exchange was installed at the Mulberry Central Office in Newark, New Jersey; but was a semi-automatic system using non-dial telephones.
- 25 January 1915: First transcontinental telephone call (3600 miles), with Thomas Augustus Watson at 333 Grant Avenue in San Francisco receiving a call from Alexander Graham Bell at 15 Dey Street in New York City, facilitated by a newly invented vacuum tube amplifier.
- 21 October 1915: First transmission of speech across the Atlantic Ocean by radiotelephone from Arlington, Virginia to Paris, France.
- 1919: The first rotary dial telephones in the Bell System installed in Norfolk, Virginia. Telephones that lacked dials and touch-tone pads were no longer made by the Bell System after 1978.
- 1919: AT&T conducts more than 4,000 measurements of people's heads to gauge the best dimensions of standard headsets so that callers' lips would be near the microphone when holding handsets up to their ears.

== 1920 to 1969 ==
- 18 April 1920: At the moment of funeral services for former AT&T President Theodore N. Vail, telephone service was halted across the United States from 11:00 to 11:01 a.m. Eastern Time (8:00 to 8:01 a.m. Pacific Time) for the first time. The moment of silence affected 12 million AT&T telephones.
- 16 July 1920: World's first radiotelephone service commences public service between Los Angeles and Santa Catalina Island.
- 11 April 1921: Opening of deep sea cable from Key West, Florida, to Havana, Cuba (115 miles).
- 2 Aug 1922: For only the second time in history, telephone lines were halted for one minute across the United States, on the day of the death of Alexander Graham Bell, inventor of the telephone.
- 22 December 1923: Opening of second transcontinental telephone line via a southern route.
- 7 March 1926: First transatlantic telephone call, from London to New York.
- 7 January 1927: Transatlantic telephone service inaugurated for commercial service (3500 miles).
- 17 January 1927: Opening of third transcontinental telephone line via a northern route.
- 7 April 1927: world's first videophone call via an electro-mechanical AT&T unit, from Washington, D.C. to New York City, by then-Commerce Secretary Herbert Hoover.
- 8 December 1929: Opening of commercial ship-to-shore telephone service.
- 3 April 1930: Opening of transoceanic telephone service to Argentina, Chile, and Uruguay and subsequently to all other South American countries.
- 1931: The Ericsson DBH 1001 telephone was the first telephone without a separate ringer box.
- 25 April 1935: First telephone call around the world by wire and radio.
- 1937: The Western Electric type 302 telephone becomes available for service in the United States.
- 8 December 1937: Opening of fourth transcontinental telephone line.
- 1941: Multi-frequency dialing introduced for operators in Baltimore, Maryland
- 1942: Telephone production is halted at Western Electric until 1945 for civilian distribution due to the retooling of factories for military equipment during World War II.
- 1946: National Numbering Plan (area codes)
- 1946: first commercial mobile phone call
- 1946: Bell Labs develops the germanium point-contact transistor
- 1947: December, W. Rae Young and Douglas H. Ring, Bell Labs engineers, proposed hexagonal cells for provisioning of mobile telephone service.
- 1948: Phil Porter, a Bell Labs engineer, proposed that cell towers be at the corners of the hexagons rather than the centers and have directional antennas pointing in 3 directions.
- 1950: The Western Electric Type 500 telephone becomes available in the United States after announcement in 1949.
- 30 June 1948: First public demonstration of the transistor by Bell Telephone Laboratories.
- 10 November 1951: direct distance dialing (DDD) first offered on trial basis at Englewood, New Jersey, to 11 selected major cities across the United States; this service grew rapidly across major cities during the 1950s
- 1955: the laying of trans-Atlantic cable TAT-1 began – 36 circuits, later increased to 48 by reducing the bandwidth from 4 kHz to 3 kHz
- 1957: First semiconductor oxiode(silicon dioxide) planar transitors by Frosch and Derick at Bell Labs.
- 1958: Modems used for direct connection via voice phone lines
- 1959: The Princess telephone is introduced in the Bell System in the United States.
- 1959: UKs first public car radio-telephone service opens in Liverpool and Manchester
- 1959: Following Frosch and Derick research at Bell Labs, Mohamed Atalla and Dawon Kahng proposed a silicon MOS transistor in 1959 at Bell Labs.
- 1960: A working MOSFET is built by a team at Bell Labs. E. E. LaBate and E. I. Povilonis made the device; M. O. Thurston, L. A. D’Asaro, and J. R. Ligenza developed the diffusion processes, and H. K. Gummel and R. Lindner characterized the device.
- 1 November 1960: The Bell System begins testing its push-button phone, starting with service in Findlay, Ohio.
- 1960: Bell Labs conducts extensive field trial of an electronic central office in Morris, Illinois, known at the Morris System.
- 1960s: Bell Labs developed the electronics for cellular phones
- 1961: Initiation of Touch-Tone service trials
- 1962: T-1 service in Skokie, Illinois
- 18 November 1963: AT&T commences the first subscriber Touch-Tone service in the towns of Carnegie and Greensburg, Pennsylvania, using push-button telephones that replaced rotary dial instruments.
- 25 November 1963: For only the third time in history, telephone service in the United States was halted for one minute. At noon, Eastern time, AT&T operators bowed their heads in mourning for late U.S. President John F. Kennedy, on the day of his state funeral.
- 31 May 1965: The world's first electronic switching system commences commercial service in Succasunna, New Jersey, in form of the 1ESS.
- 1965: first geosynchronous communications satellite – 240 circuits or one TV signal
- 1965: The Trimline telephone is introduced by Western Electric for use in the Bell System.

== 1970 to 1999 ==
- 1970: ESS-2 electronic switch.
- 1970: modular telephone cords and jacks introduced.
- 1970: Amos E. Joel, Jr. of Bell Labs invented the "call handoff" system for "cellular mobile communication system" (patent granted 1972).
- 1970: British companies Pye TMC, Marconi-Elliott and GEC develop the digital push-button telephone, based on metal–oxide–semiconductor (MOS) integrated circuit (IC) technology. It uses MOS memory chips to store phone numbers, which could then be used for speed dialing.
- 1971: AT&T submitted a proposal for cellular phone service to the U.S. Federal Communications Commission (FCC).
- 3 April 1973: Motorola employee Martin Cooper placed the first hand-held cell phone call to Joel Engel, head of research at AT&T's Bell Labs, while talking on the first Motorola DynaTAC prototype.
- 1973: packet switched voice connections over ARPANET with Network Voice Protocol (NVP).
- 1973: Bell Labs combined MOS technology with touch-tone technology to develop a push-button MOS touch-tone phone called the "Touch-O-Matic" telephone, which uses MOS integrated circuit chips and could store up to 32 phone numbers.
- 1974: David A. Hodges, Paul R. Gray and R.E. Suarez at UC Berkeley develop MOS mixed-signal integrated circuit technology, in the form of the MOS switched capacitor (SC) circuit, which they use to develop the digital-to-analog converter (DAC) chip used in digital telephony.
- 1975: Paul R. Gray and J. McCreary develop the analog-to-digital converter (ADC) MOS chip, used in digital telephony.
- 1976: Kazuo Hashimoto invented Caller ID
- 1978: Bell Labs launched a trial of the first commercial cellular network in Chicago using Advanced Mobile Phone System (AMPS).
- 1978: World's first NMT phone call in Tampere, Finland.
- 1979: VoIP – NVP running on top of early versions of IP
- 1980: W.C. Black and David A. Hodges develop the silicon-gate CMOS (complementary MOS) pulse-code modulation (PCM) codec-filter chip, which has since been the industry standard for digital telephony, widely used in the public switched telephone network (PSTN) as well as cordless telephones and cell phones.
- 1981: The world's first fully automatic mobile phone system NMT is started in Sweden and Norway.
- 1981: BT introduces the British Telephone Sockets system.
- 1982: FCC approved AT&T proposal for AMPS and allocated frequencies in the 824–894 MHz band.
- 1982: Caller ID patented by Carolyn Doughty, Bell Labs
- 1983: last manual telephone switchboard in Maine is retired
- 1984: AT&T completes the divestiture of its local operating companies. This forms a new AT&T (long-distance service and equipment sales) and the Baby Bells.
- 1987: ADSL introduced
- 1988: First transatlantic fiber optic cable TAT-8, carrying 40,000 circuits
- 1990: analog AMPS was superseded by Digital AMPS.
- 1991: the GSM mobile phone network is started in Finland, with the first phone call in Tampere.
- 1993: Telecom Relay Service available for the disabled
- 1994: The IBM Simon becomes the first smartphone on the market.
- 1995: Caller ID implemented nationally in USA
- 1999: creation of the Asterisk Private branch exchange

== 2000 to present ==
- 11 June 2002: Antonio Meucci is recognized for "...his work in the invention of the telephone" (but not "...for inventing the telephone") by the United States House of Representatives, in United States HRes. 269.
- 21 June 2002: The Parliament of Canada responds by passing a motion unanimously 10 days later recognizing Alexander Graham Bell as the inventor of the telephone.
- 2005: Mink, Louisiana, finally receives traditional landline telephone service (one of the last in the United States).

== See also ==
- Bell Telephone Memorial, a major monument dedicated to the invention of the telephone
- History of the telephone
- History of mobile phones
- Invention of the telephone
- Push-button telephone
- Telephone
- Elisha Gray and Alexander Bell telephone controversy

== Bibliography ==
- Bourseul, Charles (1854), Transmission électrique de la parole, Paris: L'Illustration, 26 August 1854.(in French)
- Thompson, Sylvanus P. (1883), Philipp Reis, Inventor of the Telephone, London: E. & F. N. Spon, 1883.
- Coe, Lewis (1995), The Telephone and Its Several Inventors: A History, North Carolina: McFarland, 1995. ISBN 0-7864-0138-9
- Baker, Burton H. (2000), The Gray Matter: The Forgotten Story of the Telephone, Telepress, St. Joseph, Michigan, 2000. ISBN 0-615-11329-X
- Josephson, Matthew (1992), Edison: A Biography, Wiley, ISBN 0-471-54806-5
- Bruce, Robert V. (1990), Bell: Alexander Bell and the Conquest of Solitude, Cornell University Press, 1990. ISBN 0-8014-9691-8
- Farley, Tom (2007), "The Cell-Phone Revolution", Invention & Technology, Winter 2007, vol. 22:3, pages 8–19.
