= List of United States Supreme Court cases, volume 126 =

Supreme Court of the United States
- Interactive map of Supreme Court of the United States
- 38°53′26″N 77°00′16″W
- Established: March 4, 1789; 236 years ago
- Location: Washington, D.C.
- Coordinates: 38°53′26″N 77°00′16″W
- Composition method: Presidential nomination with Senate confirmation
- Authorised by: Constitution of the United States, Art. III, § 1
- Judge term length: life tenure, subject to impeachment and removal
- Number of positions: 9 (by statute)
- Website: supremecourt.gov

This is a list of cases reported in volume 126 of United States Reports, decided by the Supreme Court of the United States in 1888.

== Justices of the Supreme Court at the time of volume 126 U.S. ==
The Supreme Court is established by Article III, Section 1 of the Constitution of the United States, which says: "The judicial Power of the United States, shall be vested in one supreme Court . . .". The size of the Court is not specified; the Constitution leaves it to Congress to set the number of justices. Under the Judiciary Act of 1789 Congress originally fixed the number of justices at six (one chief justice and five associate justices). Since 1789 Congress has varied the size of the Court from six to seven, nine, ten, and back to nine justices (always including one chief justice).

When the cases in volume 126 U.S. were decided the Court comprised the following eight members (Justice Lucius Quintus Cincinnatus Lamar had not yet joined the Court after the death of Justice William Burnham Woods in 1887):

| Portrait | Justice | Office | Home State | Succeeded | Date confirmed by the Senate (Vote) | Tenure on Supreme Court |
|---|---|---|---|---|---|---|
| | Morrison Waite | Chief Justice | Ohio | Salmon P. Chase | January 21, 1874 (63–0) | March 4, 1874 – March 23, 1888 (Died) |
| | Samuel Freeman Miller | Associate Justice | Iowa | Peter Vivian Daniel | July 16, 1862 (Acclamation) | July 21, 1862 – October 13, 1890 (Died) |
| | Stephen Johnson Field | Associate Justice | California | newly created seat | March 10, 1863 (Acclamation) | May 10, 1863 – December 1, 1897 (Retired) |
| | Joseph P. Bradley | Associate Justice | New Jersey | newly created seat | March 21, 1870 (46–9) | March 23, 1870 – January 22, 1892 (Died) |
| | John Marshall Harlan | Associate Justice | Kentucky | David Davis | November 29, 1877 (Acclamation) | December 10, 1877 – October 14, 1911 (Died) |
| | Stanley Matthews | Associate Justice | Ohio | Noah Haynes Swayne | May 12, 1881 (24–23) | May 17, 1881 – March 22, 1889 (Died) |
| | Horace Gray | Associate Justice | Massachusetts | Nathan Clifford | December 20, 1881 (51–5) | January 9, 1882 – September 15, 1902 (Died) |
| | Samuel Blatchford | Associate Justice | New York | Ward Hunt | March 22, 1882 (Acclamation) | April 3, 1882 – July 7, 1893 (Died) |

== Citation style ==
Under the Judiciary Act of 1789 the federal court structure at the time comprised District Courts, which had general trial jurisdiction; Circuit Courts, which had mixed trial and appellate (from the US District Courts) jurisdiction; and the United States Supreme Court, which had appellate jurisdiction over the federal District and Circuit courts—and for certain issues over state courts. The Supreme Court also had limited original jurisdiction (i.e., in which cases could be filed directly with the Supreme Court without first having been heard by a lower federal or state court). There were one or more federal District Courts and/or Circuit Courts in each state, territory, or other geographical region.

Bluebook citation style is used for case names, citations, and jurisdictions.

- "C.C.D." = United States Circuit Court for the District of . . .
  - e.g.,"C.C.D.N.J." = United States Circuit Court for the District of New Jersey
- "D." = United States District Court for the District of . . .
  - e.g.,"D. Mass." = United States District Court for the District of Massachusetts
- "E." = Eastern; "M." = Middle; "N." = Northern; "S." = Southern; "W." = Western
  - e.g.,"C.C.S.D.N.Y." = United States Circuit Court for the Southern District of New York
  - e.g.,"M.D. Ala." = United States District Court for the Middle District of Alabama
- "Ct. Cl." = United States Court of Claims
- The abbreviation of a state's name alone indicates the highest appellate court in that state's judiciary at the time.
  - e.g.,"Pa." = Supreme Court of Pennsylvania
  - e.g.,"Me." = Supreme Judicial Court of Maine

== List of cases in volume 126 U.S. ==
In volume 126, unique for the United States Reports, an entire volume comprises reports of one set of related cases: The Telephone Cases. They are six cases appealed from various lower courts. The cases all relate to the invention of the telephone. In The Telephone Cases the Supreme Court upheld the priority of patents belonging to Alexander Graham Bell, which were used by the American Bell Telephone Company and the Bell System. The decisions were announced on 19 March 1888, four days before the author of the opinions, Chief Justice Morrison Waite, died unexpectedly of pneumonia.

| Case Name | Page & year | Opinion of the Court | Concurring opinion(s) | Dissenting opinion(s) | Lower Court | Disposition |
|---|---|---|---|---|---|---|
| Dolbear v. American Bell Telephone Company | 1 (1888) | Waite | none | Bradley | C.C.D. Mass. | affirmed |
| Molecular Telephone Company v. American Bell Telephone Company | 1 (1888) | Waite | none | Bradley | C.C.S.D.N.Y. | reversed |
| American Bell Telephone Company v. Molecular Telephone Company | 1 (1888) | Waite | none | Bradley | C.C.S.D.N.Y. | affirmed |
| Clay Commercial Telephone Company v. American Bell Telephone Company | 1 (1888) | Waite | none | Bradley | C.C.E.D. Pa. | affirmed |
| People's Telephone Company v. American Bell Telephone Company | 1 (1888) | Waite | none | Bradley | C.C.S.D.N.Y. | affirmed |
| Overland Telephone Company v. American Bell Telephone Company | 1 (1888) | Waite | none | Bradley | C.C.S.D.N.Y. | affirmed |

== See also ==
- Elisha Gray and Alexander Bell telephone controversy
- History of the telephone
- Timeline of the telephone
