= Reis telephone =

19th-century musical telephone

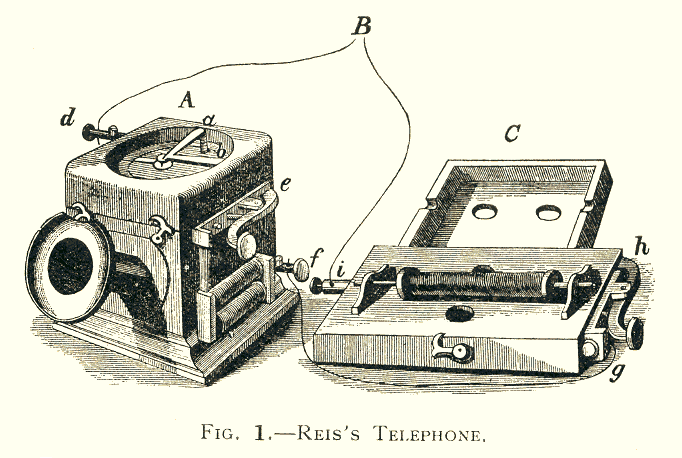
The Reis Telephone

The Reis telephone was an early sound transmitting device, invented by Philipp Reis in 1857. Reis's first successful work is dated to October 1861. When properly set up, which was difficult to do reproducibly, it would allow verbal communication via electronic signals. Many sources credit Reis as the inventor of the first telephone. Others point to the prior work of Antonio Meucci, or to later work of Elisha Gray or Alexander Graham Bell. It is generally agreed that Reis coined the word telephon, which has been anglicised to telephone.

== History ==
In 1861, Philipp Reis succeeded in creating a device that captured sound, converted it to electrical impulses that were transmitted via electrical wires to another device, which transformed these pulses into recognizable sounds similar to the original acoustical source. Reis coined the term telephon to describe his device.

In 1862, Wilhelm von Legat, Inspector of the Royal Prussian Telegraph Corps, published an article on Reis' invention. von Legat provided a theoretical explanation for

why, in the practical experiments... melodies... are transferred with astonishing correctness, whereas single words in reading, speaking, and so forth, could be noticed less distinctly, not withstanding here, also, the flexions of the voice are allowed to assist the interrogatory, exclaiming, astonishing and appealing cadence. Undoubtedly, the matter discussed here, before attaining a practical form, will need considerable perfection... Still, I am persuaded, after repeated practical experiments, that the following up of this matter will prove to be of the highest theoretical interest, and its practical realization in this intelligent age will not be long delayed.

In 1865, David Edward Hughes tested Reis' invention at St Petersburg, finding that it was "often" able to successfully transmit words "due to an accidental adjustment of [its] contacts to a true microphonic condition".

A translation of Legat's article on Reis' invention was obtained by Thomas Edison prior to his filing his patent application on a telephone in 1877. In correspondence of 1885, Edison credits Reis as having invented "the first telephone", with the limitation that it was "only musical not articulating".

In 1878, Edison's recently-patented design for a telephone was explained by inventor Samuel M Plush as having been based on Reis' 1861 invention. Plush described Reis' invention as being "the first telephone", explaining that "This apparatus was capable of reproducing but one of the characteristics of sound, viz., pitch. Further experiment was necessary to reproduce its quality and dynamic force."

== Microphone ==
As Reis was considering his invention as a means of broadcasting music, he termed his microphone the 'singing station'. The Reis microphone was based on a horizontal parchment diaphragm as a sound transducer. The diaphragm was mounted on the top of a closed wooden sound box, with a speaking horn on the front. Sound received by the horn caused the diaphragm to vibrate. Above this were two brass strips, later with two platinum contacts, originally with a single platinum contact, and the lower contact formed of a drop of mercury in a recess at the end of the screw. One strip was glued to the center of the diaphragm; another strip, usually two strips in a V, was mounted above this. The strip's weight gave a light pressure between the contacts.

Sound vibrations caused the diaphragm and lower contact to vibrate in sympathy. This changed the resistance between the two contacts, giving an electrical signal to the telephone line.

=== Patent dispute in the US ===
There was some question as to the operation of the Reis microphone. It is regarded today as having varied the resistance of the contacts. However, Reis's description claimed that the contacts opened and closed. At the time, it was held that a circuit with such a 'make and break' circuit was incapable of transmitting intelligible speech. Reis's device had been used to transmit speech from 1861, and widely publicly demonstrated from 1863, yet when Bell's patent claim was set against Reis's primacy of inventing the telephone this 'inability' for it to work because of its use of a "false theory" was enough to (legally) portray Reis's invention as invalid, thus allowing Bell to claim novelty.

Historian Lewis Coe identified another reason why Reis was unable to claim priority in US Patent disputes:

Possibly the main reason that the Reis priority never stood up in court was that no one seemed to be able to demonstrate a Reis instrument in the transmission of articulate speech. Once, when attorneys were attempting to demonstrate the Reis instrument in court they could not get the right adjustment on the apparatus, succeeding only in producing squeaks and squawks, but no speech. Finally, one of them in disgust exclaimed, "it can speak, but it won't."

== Loudspeaker ==
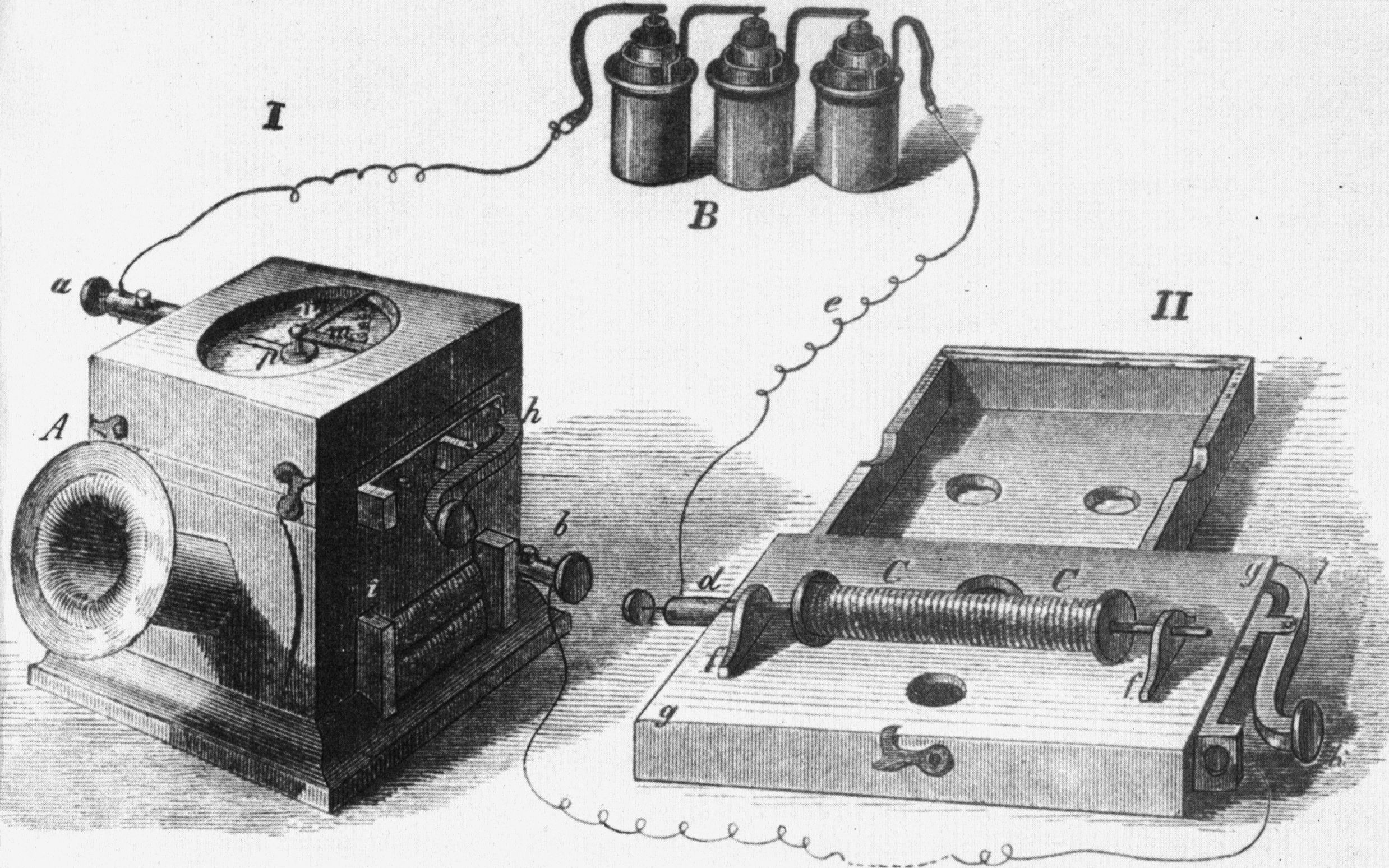
Johann Philipp Reis telephone

Reis's speaker worked by magnetostriction. In his first receiver he wound a coil of wire around an iron knitting needle and rested the needle against the F hole of a violin. As current passed through the needle, the iron shrank and a click was produced. The image, below, shows an advanced version where the iron bar is clamped to a cigar-box-shaped resonator. This receiver is not very sensitive. It produces weak sound but has good fidelity. It requires very high current and is a current-sensitive device rather than a voltage-sensitive device.

== See also ==
- Telephone
- History of the telephone
- Invention of the telephone
- Timeline of the telephone
- List of German inventors and discoverers
