= Anthony Pollok =

American patent attorney (c.1829–1898)

Anthony Pollok (c. 1829 – July 4, 1898) was an American patent attorney who, with Marcellus Bailey, helped prepare Alexander Graham Bell's patents for the telephone and related inventions.

== Biography ==
Anthony Pollock was born in the Austrian Empire about 1828-1829 He graduated from the Ecole Centrale of Paris and was Chevalier of the Legion of Honor of France. Pollok immigrated to the United States about 1884 where he built a successful law practice and enjoyed the opulent lifestyle of a prosperous Washington, D.C. lawyer. Pollok's office was a half block from the Patent Office. He was vice-president of the International Convention for the Protection of Industrial Property and testified twice before the Committee on Foreign Affairs of the U.S. Senate.

When Alexander Graham Bell began work on the telephone, Pollok was a partner with patent lawyer Marcellus Bailey in the law firm of Pollok & Bailey. Bell's patron and future father-in-law Gardiner Hubbard paid Pollok and Bailey to work on Bell's patent applications and patents. The well-connected Anthony Pollok was also one of Hubbard's associates in promoting the "U.S. Postal Telegraph Bill" that would have bought all the telegraph lines from Western Union to make the telegraph industry a government monopoly, similar to the telegraph monopolies employed by several European countries. The proposed bill (law) did not pass its vote.

After Bell's patent application for the telephone was approved on February 29, 1876, Pollok invited Bell to his home to celebrate. Bell wrote to his father:

"Mr. Pollok has the most palatial residence of any that I have ever seen. It is certainly the finest and best appointed of any in Washington. None of the rooms are less than fifteen feet high. The portico is also about fifteen feet high - supported by massive polished Aberdeen-granite pillars. Mr. Pollok has been introducing me to some of the elite of Washington. Yesterday we called upon Mrs. Bancroft (wife of the historian)... Today we called on Prof. Henry of the Smithsonian - and on Saturday Mr. Pollok gives a party in my honor - and I expect to meet Sir Edward Thornton and members of the other foreign Embassies.

The Alexander Graham Bell Papers collection at the Library of Congress contains letters from Bell to Pollok and Bailey regarding Bell's patents for the telephone.

Pollok and his wife Marie (born about 1840) were passengers on the steamship SS La Bourgogne when it sank after collision with the ship Cromartyshire on July 4, 1898.,

After their death, his heirs established the "Anthony Pollok Memorial Prize" that was offered for the best device for saving lives in case of disaster at sea. In November 1898, a sale of the estate, conducted by C.G. Sloan & Co., was held at their late residence, 1700 I Street, N.W., Washington, D.C.

== See also ==
- Alexander Graham Bell
- Bell Telephone Memorial
- Marcellus Bailey
- Elisha Gray and Alexander Bell telephone controversy

== Some patents that Pollok & Bailey prosecuted ==
- U.S. patent 363,320 issued May 17, 1887, basic patent for arc welding, inventors Benardos & Olszewski
- U.S. patent 161,739 Improvement in Transmitters and Receivers for Electric Telegraphs, Bell patent filed March 6, 1875, issued April 1875 (multiplexing signals on a single wire)
- U.S. patent 174,465 Improvement in Telegraphy, Bell patent filed February 14, 1876, issued March 7, 1876 (Bell's first telephone patent)
- U.S. patent 178,399 Improvement in Telephonic Telegraph Receivers, Bell patent filed April 1876, issued June 1876
- U.S. patent 181,553 Improvement in Generating Electric Currents Bell patent filed August 1876, issued August 1876
- U.S. patent 186,787 Electric Telegraphy Bell patent filed January 15, 1877, issued January 30, 1877
