= Elisha Gray =

American electrical engineer (1835–1901)

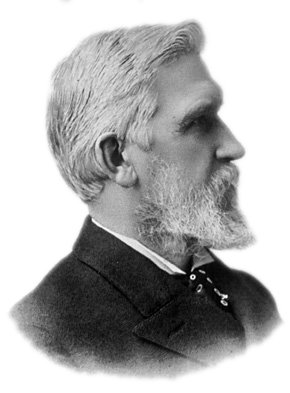
- Born: August 2, 1835; Barnesville, Ohio, U.S.
- Died: January 21, 1901 (aged 65); Newtonville, Massachusetts, U.S.
- Occupation: Engineer/Inventor
- Awards: Elliott Cresson Medal (1897)

Elisha Gray (August 2, 1835 – January 21, 1901) was an American electrical engineer who co-founded the Western Electric Manufacturing Company. Gray is best known for his development of a telephone prototype in 1876 in Highland Park, Illinois. Some recent authors have argued that Gray should be considered the true inventor of the telephone because Alexander Graham Bell allegedly stole the idea of the liquid transmitter from him. Gray had been using liquid transmitters in his telephone experiments for more than two years previously; however, Bell's patent was upheld in court.

Gray is also considered to be the father of the modern music synthesizer, and was granted over 70 patents for his inventions.

== Biography and early inventions ==
Gray was born in Barnesville, Ohio, the son of Christiana (Edgerton) and David Gray. His family were Quakers. He was brought up on a farm. He spent several years at Oberlin College, where he experimented with electrical devices. Although Gray did not graduate, he taught electricity and science there and built laboratory equipment for its science departments.

In 1862, while at Oberlin, Gray met and married Delia Minerva Shepard.

In 1865, Gray invented a self-adjusting telegraph relay that automatically adapted to varying insulation of the telegraph line. In 1867 Gray received a patent for the invention, the first of more than seventy.

In 1869, Elisha Gray and his partner Enos M. Barton founded Gray & Barton Co. in Cleveland, Ohio, to supply telegraph equipment to the giant Western Union Telegraph Company. The electrical distribution business was later spun off and organized into a separate company, Graybar Electric Company, Inc. Barton was employed by Western Union to examine and test new products.

In 1870, financing for Gray & Barton Co. was arranged by General Anson Stager, a superintendent of the Western Union Telegraph Company. Stager became an active partner in Gray & Barton Co. and remained on the board of directors. The company moved to Highland Park, near Chicago. Gray later gave up his administrative position as chief engineer to focus on inventions that could benefit the telegraph industry. Gray's inventions and patent costs were financed by a dentist, Dr. Samuel S. White of Philadelphia, who had made a fortune producing porcelain false teeth. White wanted Gray to focus on the acoustic telegraph, which promised huge profits, instead of what appeared to be unpromising competing inventions such as the telephone. White made the decision in 1876 to redirect Gray's interest in the telephone.

In 1870, Gray developed a needle annunciator for hotels and another for elevators. He also developed and patented his "Improvement in Printing Telegraph Instruments," a stock-ticker-printer which had a typewriter keyboard and printed stock- and commodities- quotes on a paper tape. The Gold & Stock Telegraph Co., located in the Western Union Building in Manhattan, sold quotes for a monthly fee of $2.50 per commodity. According to the Western Electric Manufacturing Co., "nearly one thousand are in use on private lines in various parts of the United States and Canada." There is one of these printers in the National Museum Of American History at the Smithsonian in Washington, inventory # 324269, which was donated by the Oberlin College. Elisha Gray studied and worked at the Oberlin College. There are only two printers known to exist outside the Smithsonian, serial # 145 and serial # 287. Elisha Gray is holding one of these printers in the picture on the right below on his lap. The caption to the picture refers to the printer as his "Automatic Telegraph Printer."

In 1871 the Great Chicago Fire destroyed the city and its telegraph infrastructure, Gray & Barton was hired to rebuild it. In 1872, Western Union, then financed by the Vanderbilts and J. P. Morgan, bought one-third of Gray and Barton Co. and changed the name to Western Electric Manufacturing Company of Chicago. Gray continued to invent for Western Electric.

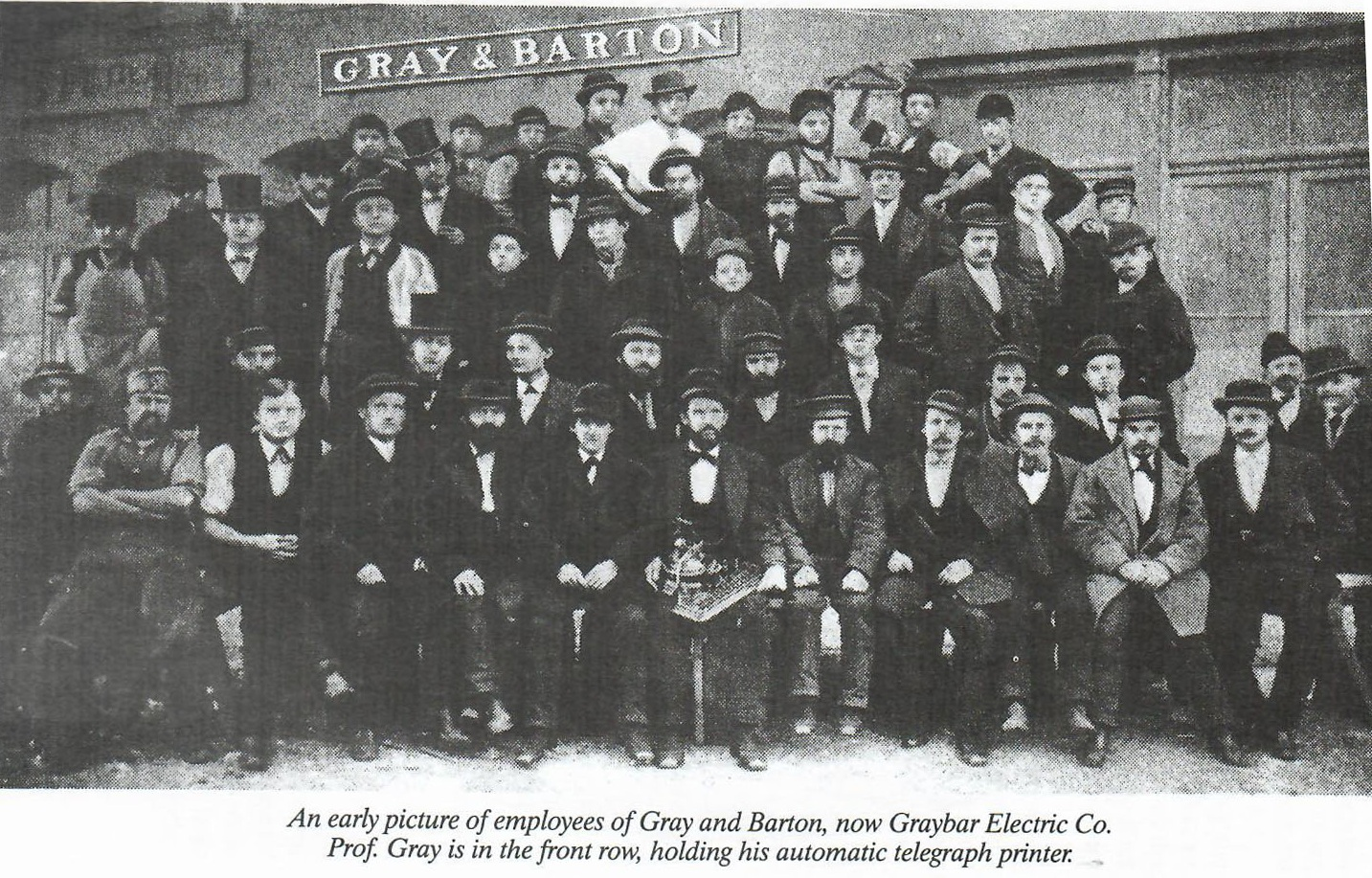
An early photo of employees of Gray and Barton. Elisha Gray is in the front row, holding his automatic telegraph printer

In 1874, Gray retired to do independent research and development. Gray applied for a patent on a harmonic telegraph which consisted of multi-tone transmitters, that controlled each tone with a separate telegraph key. Gray gave several private demonstrations of this invention in New York and Washington, D.C. in May and June 1874.

Gray was a charter member of the Presbyterian Church in Highland Park, Illinois. At the church, on December 29, 1874, Gray gave the first public demonstration of his invention for transmitting musical tones and transmitted "familiar melodies through telegraph wire" according to a newspaper announcement. This was one of the earliest electric musical instruments using vibrating electromagnetic circuits that were single-note oscillators operated by a two-octave piano keyboard. The "Musical Telegraph" used steel reeds whose oscillations were created by electromagnets and transmitted over a telegraph wire. Gray also built a simple loudspeaker in later models consisting of a vibrating diaphragm in a magnetic field to make the oscillator tones audible and louder at the receiving end. In 1900 Gray worked on an underwater signaling device. After his death in 1901 officials gave the invention to Oberlin College. A few years later he was recognized as the inventor of the underwater signaling device.

On July 27, 1875, Gray was granted U.S. patent 166,095 for "Electric Telegraph for Transmitting Musical Tones" (acoustic telegraphy). His experiments with transmitting musical tones went further, and on February 15, 1876, Elisha Gray was granted US Patent for electro-harmonic telegraph with piano keyboard.

He was elected as a member to the American Philosophical Society in 1878.

On July 31, 1888, Gray patented the telautograph, an analog precursor to the modern fax machine. Gray's patent stated that the telautograph would allow "one to transmit his own handwriting to a distant point over a two-wire circuit." It was the first facsimile machine in which the stylus was controlled by horizontal and vertical bars. The telautograph was first publicly exhibited at the 1893 World's Columbian Exposition, held in Chicago.

== Telephone ==
Because of Samuel White's opposition to Gray working on the telephone, Gray did not tell anybody about his invention for transmitting voice sounds until February 11, 1876 (Friday). The only remaining proof is a drawing he made on that day. Gray requested that his patent lawyer William D. Baldwin prepare a "caveat" for filing at the US Patent Office. A caveat was like a provisional patent application with drawings and description but without a request for examination.

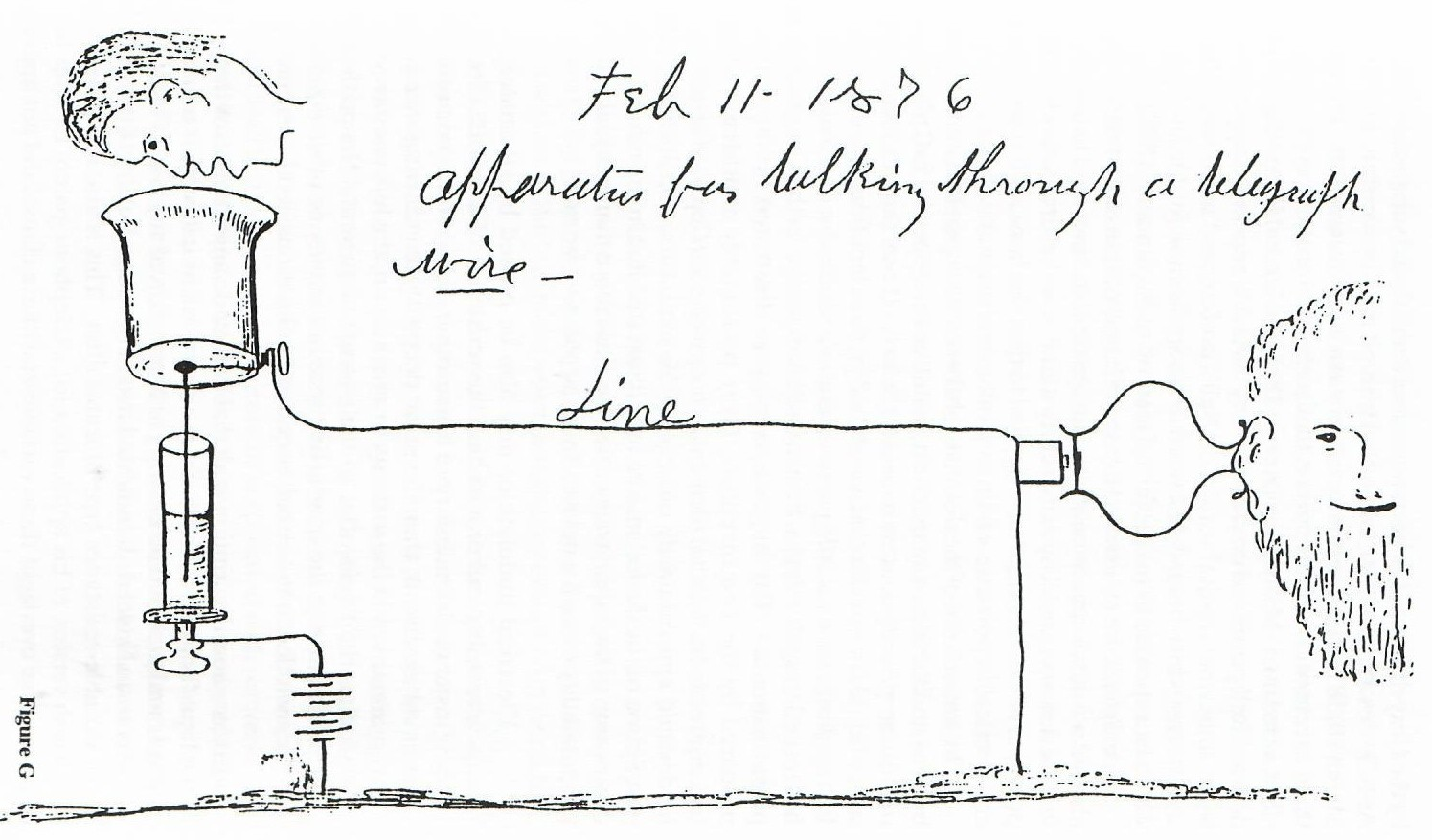
Elisha Gray's drawing of liquid transmitter made on February 11, 1876

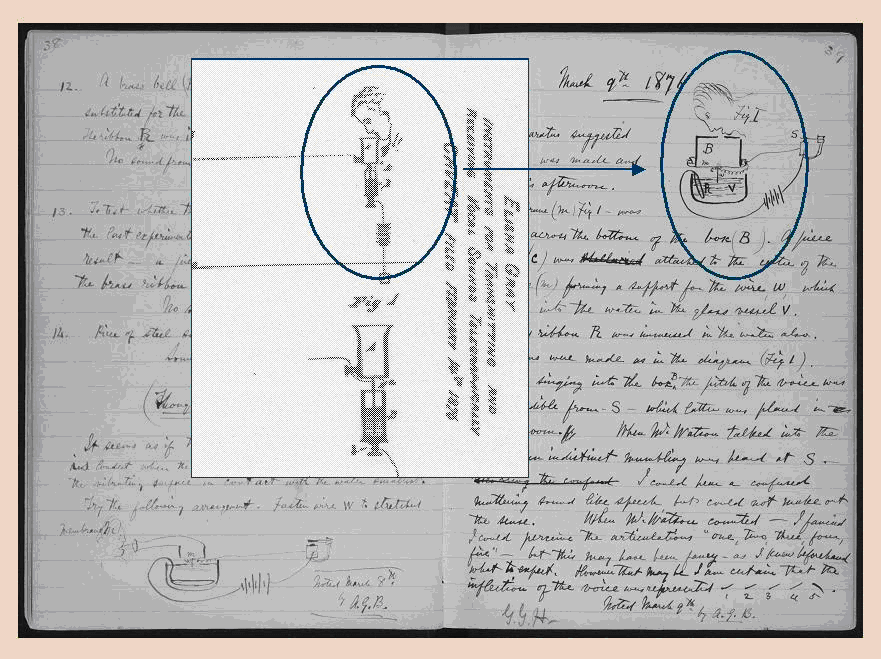
Excerpts from Elisha Gray's patent caveat of February 14 and Alexander Graham Bell's lab notebook entry of March 9, demonstrating their similarity

On Monday morning February 14, 1876, Gray signed and had notarized the caveat that described a telephone that used a liquid transmitter. Baldwin then submitted the caveat to the US Patent Office. That same morning a lawyer for Alexander Graham Bell submitted Bell's patent application. Which application arrived first is hotly disputed, although Gray believed that his caveat arrived a few hours before Bell's application. Bell's lawyers in Washington, DC, had been waiting with Bell's patent application for months, under instructions not to file it in the USA until it had been filed in Britain first. (At the time, Britain would only issue patents on discoveries not previously patented elsewhere.)

According to Evenson, during the weekend of February 12–14, 1876, before either caveat or application had been filed in the patent office, Bell's lawyer learned about the liquid transmitter idea in Gray's caveat that would be filed early Monday morning February 14. Bell's lawyer then added seven sentences describing the liquid transmitter and a variable resistance claim to Bell's draft application. After the lawyer's clerk recopied the draft as a finished patent application, Bell's lawyer hand-delivered the finished application to the patent office just before noon Monday, a few hours after Gray's caveat was delivered by Gray's lawyer. Bell's lawyer requested that Bell's application be immediately recorded and hand-delivered to the examiner on Monday so that later Bell could claim it had arrived first. Bell was in Boston at this time and was not aware that his application had been filed.

Five days later, on February 19, Zenas Fisk Wilber, the patent examiner for both Bell's application and Gray's caveat, noticed that Bell's application claimed the same variable resistance feature described in Gray's caveat. Wilber suspended Bell's application for 90 days to give Gray time to submit a competing patent application. The suspension also gave Bell time to amend his claims to avoid an interference with an earlier patent application of Gray's that mentioned changing the intensity of the electric current without breaking the circuit, which seemed to the examiner to be an "undulatory current" that Bell was claiming. Such an interference would delay Bell's application until Bell submitted proof, under the first to invent rules, that Bell had invented that feature before Gray.

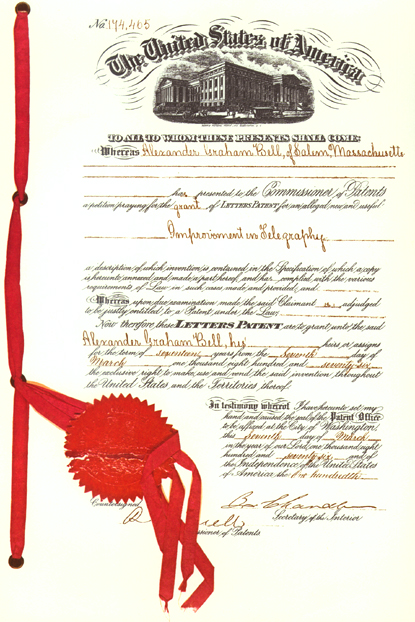
The master telephone patent awarded to Bell, No. 174465, March 7, 1876

Bell's lawyer telegraphed Bell, who was still in Boston, to come to Washington, DC. When Bell arrived on February 26, Bell visited his lawyers and then visited examiner Wilber who told Bell that Gray's caveat showed a liquid transmitter and asked Bell for proof that the liquid transmitter idea (described in Bell's patent application as using mercury as the liquid) was invented by Bell. Bell pointed to an application of Bell's filed a year earlier where mercury was used in a circuit breaker. The examiner accepted this argument, although mercury would not have worked in a telephone transmitter. On February 29, Bell's lawyer submitted an amendment to Bell's claims that distinguished them from Gray's caveat and Gray's earlier application. On March 3, Wilber approved Bell's application and on March 7, 1876, 174,465 was published by the U.S. Patent Office.

Bell returned to Boston and resumed work on March 9, drawing a diagram in his lab notebook of a water transmitter being used face down, very similar to that shown in Gray's caveat. Bell and Watson built and tested a liquid transmitter design on March 10 and successfully transmitted clear speech saying "Mr. Watson – come here – I want to see you." Bell's notebooks became public when they were donated to the Library of Congress in 1976.

Although Bell has been accused of stealing the telephone from Gray because his liquid transmitter design resembled Gray's, documents in the Library of Congress indicate that Bell had been using liquid transmitters extensively for three years in his multiple telegraph and other experiments. In April, 1875, ten months before the alleged theft of Gray's design, the U.S. Patent Office granted 161,739 to Bell for a primitive fax machine, which he called the "autograph telegraph." The patent drawing includes liquid transmitters.

After March 1876, Bell and Watson focused on improving the electromagnetic telephone and never used Gray's liquid transmitter in public demonstrations or commercial use.

Although Gray had abandoned his caveat, Gray applied for a patent for the same invention in late 1877. This put him in a second interference with Bell's patents. The Patent Office determined, "while Gray was undoubtedly the first to conceive of and disclose the [variable resistance] invention, as in his caveat of February 14, 1876, his failure to take any action amounting to completion until others had demonstrated the utility of the invention deprives him of the right to have it considered." Gray challenged Bell's patent anyway, and after two years of litigation, Bell was awarded rights to the invention, and as a result, Bell is credited as the inventor.

In 1886, Wilber stated in an affidavit that he was an alcoholic and deeply in debt to Bell's lawyer Marcellus Bailey with whom Wilber had served in the Civil War. Wilber stated that, contrary to Patent Office rules, he showed Bailey the caveat Gray had filed. He also stated that he showed the caveat to Bell and Bell gave him $100. Bell testified that they only discussed the patent in general terms, although in a letter to Gray, Bell admitted that he learned some of the technical details. Wilber's affidavit contradicted his earlier testimony, and historians have pointed out that his last affidavit was drafted for him by the attorneys for the Pan-Electric Company which was attempting to steal the Bell patents and was later discovered to have bribed the U.S. Attorney General Augustus Garland and several Congressmen.

Bell's patent was disputed in 1888 by attorney Lysander Hill who accused Wilber of allowing Bell or his lawyer Pollok to add a handwritten margin note of seven sentences to Bell's application that describe an alternate design similar to Gray's liquid microphone design. However, the marginal note was added only to Bell's earlier draft, not to his patent application that shows the seven sentences already present in a paragraph. Bell testified that he added those seven sentences in the margin of an earlier draft of his application "almost at the last moment before sending it off to Washington" to his lawyers. Bell or his lawyer could not have added the seven sentences to the application after it was filed in the Patent Office, because then the application would not have been suspended.

== Further inventions and death ==
In 1887, Gray invented the telautograph, a device that could remotely transmit handwriting through telegraph systems. Gray was granted several patents for these pioneer fax machines, and the Gray National Telautograph Company was chartered in 1888 and continued in business as The Telautograph Corporation for many years; after a series of mergers it was finally absorbed by Xerox in the 1990s. Gray's telautograph machines were used by banks for signing documents at a distance and by the military for sending written commands during gun tests when the deafening noise from the guns made spoken orders on the telephone impractical. The machines were also used at train stations for schedule changes.

Gray displayed his telautograph invention in 1893 at the 1893 Columbian Exposition and sold his share in the telautograph shortly after that. Gray was also chairman of the International Congress of Electricians at the World's Columbian Exposition of 1893.

Gray conceived of a primitive closed-circuit television system that he called the "telephone". Pictures would be focused on an array of selenium cells and signals from the selenium cells would be transmitted to a distant station on separate wires. At the receiving end, each wire would open or close a shutter to recreate the image.

In 1899, Gray moved to Boston where he continued inventing. One of his projects was to develop an underwater signaling device to transmit messages to ships. One such signaling device was tested on December 31, 1900. Three weeks later, on January 21, 1901, Gray died from a heart attack, originally diagnosed as neuralgia of the heart, in Newtonville, Massachusetts.

Some modern authors incorrectly credit Elisha Gray as the namesake of the Gray code, which is actually named after 20th century physicist and electrical researcher Frank Gray.

== Publications ==
Gray wrote several books including:

- Experimental Researches in Electro-Harmonic Telegraphy and Telephony, 1867–1876 (Appleton, 1878)
- Telegraphy and Telephony (1878)
- Electricity and Magnetism (1900) and
- Nature's Miracles (1900) a nontechnical discussion of science and technology for the general public.

== See also ==
- Invention of the telephone
- Timeline of the telephone
- The Telephone Cases
- Water microphone
