= Mink, Louisiana =

Mink
- Unincorporated community
- Location within Louisiana Location within the United States
- Country: United States
- State: Louisiana
- Parish: Natchitoches
- Time zone: UTC-6 (CST)
  - Summer (DST): UTC-5 (CDT)
- Area code: 318

Mink is an unincorporated community in Natchitoches Parish, Louisiana, United States, approximately 100 miles (160 km) south of Shreveport. It is in Kisatchie National Forest.

Mink was one of the last places in the United States to receive traditional landline telephone service. Service began in February 2005.

== See also ==
- Timeline of the telephone
