= Elisha Gray and Alexander Bell telephone controversy =

Legal dispute over the invention of the telephone

The Elisha Gray and Alexander Graham Bell controversy concerns the question of whether Elisha Gray and Alexander Graham Bell invented the telephone independently. This issue is narrower than the question of who deserves credit for inventing the telephone, for which there are several claimants.

At issue are roles of each inventor's lawyers, the filing of patent documents, and allegations of theft.

== Background ==
Alexander Graham Bell was a professor of elocution at Boston University and tutor of deaf children. He had begun electrical experiments in Scotland in 1867 and, after emigrating to Boston from Canada, pursued research into a method of telegraphy that could transmit multiple messages over a single wire simultaneously, a so-called "harmonic telegraph". Bell formed a partnership with two of his students' parents, including prominent Boston lawyer Gardiner Hubbard, to help fund his research in exchange for shares of any future profits. He experimented with many different possible transmitters and receivers from 1872 to 1876, created numerous drawings of liquid transmitters, and obtained a patent in 1875 for a primitive fax machine using liquid transmitters, which appear in the published drawings in the U.S. Patent Office.

Elisha Gray was a prominent inventor in Highland Park, Illinois. His Western Electric company was a major supplier to the telegraph company Western Union. In 1874, Bell was in competition with Elisha Gray to be the first to invent the practical harmonic telegraph.

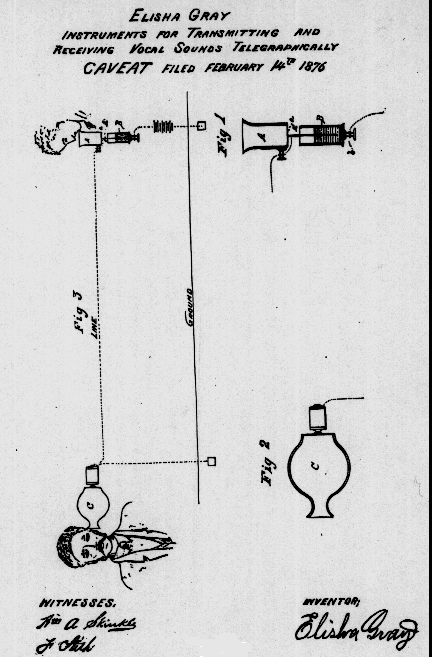
Elisha Gray's patent caveat for the invention of the telephone

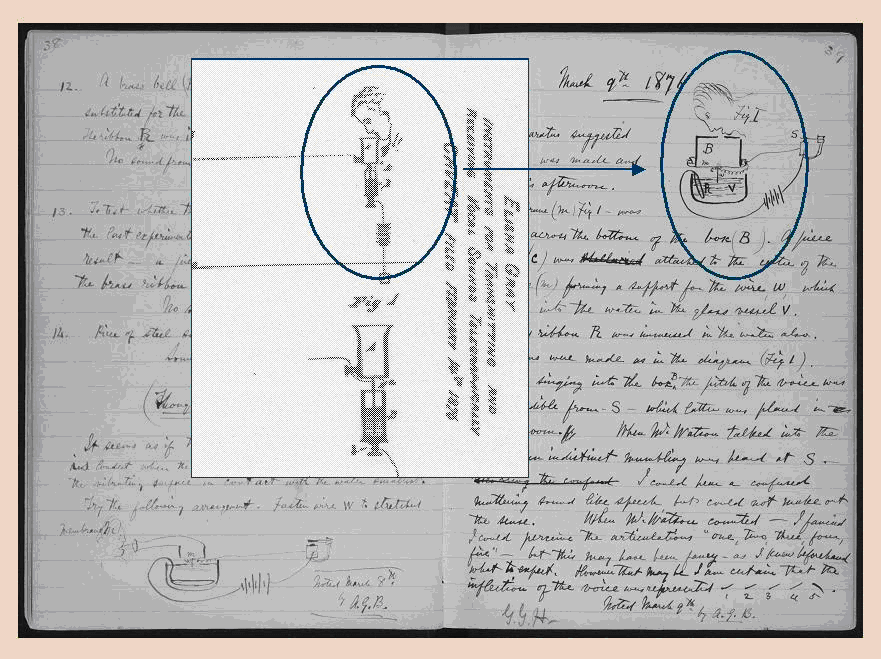
Excerpts from Elisha Gray's patent caveat of February 14 and Alexander Graham Bell's lab notebook entry of March 8, demonstrating similarities.

In the summer of 1874, Gray developed a harmonic telegraph device using vibrating reeds that could transmit musical tones, but not intelligible speech. In December 1874, he demonstrated it to the public at Highland Park First Presbyterian Church.

After largely abandoning these early experiments, fourteen months later on February 11, 1876, Gray included a diagram for a telephone in his notebook. On February 14, Gray's lawyer filed a patent caveat with a similar diagram. The same day, Bell's lawyer filed (hand-delivered to the U.S. Patent Office) a patent application on the harmonic telegraph, including its use for transmitting vocal sounds. On February 19, the patent office suspended Bell's application for three months to give Gray time to submit a full patent application with claims, after which the patent office would begin interference proceedings to determine whether Bell or Gray were first to invent the telephone. Commissioner of Patents Ellis Spear later revoked this suspension because it appeared that Bell's submission had occurred two hours before Gray's, though this was also disputed.

At that time, the USPTO did not require a submission of a working patent model for the patent application to be accepted, but the acceptance process often took years, and with interference proceedings that often involved public hearings. The U.S. Congress had abolished the requirement for patent models in 1870.

On February 24, 1876, Bell traveled to Washington D.C. Nothing was entered in his lab notebook until his return to Boston on March 7. Bell's patent was issued on March 7. On March 8, Bell recorded an experiment in his lab notebook, with a diagram similar to that of Gray's patent caveat (see right). Bell finally got his telephone model to work on March 10, when Bell and his assistant Thomas A. Watson both recorded the famous "Watson — come here — I want to see you" story in their notebooks.

If there appears to be a similarity between the Gray and Bell drawings, there is also the possibility that Gray may have had knowledge of Bell's experiments. The community of electrical inventors was small at the time, and gossip spread quickly. In a letter written to Gardiner Greene Hubbard on August 14, 1875, Bell urged Hubbard to patent the telephone concept and added "it might be unwise to let Gray know anything about it." In 1928, Bell's secretary, Catherine MacKenzie, recalled Bell telling her that "I had always entertained ungenerous thoughts of Mr. Gray and believed him capable of spying upon me. Indeed, this idea subsequently led me to remove my apparatus entirely from Mr. Williams' shop to private rooms at Exeter Place."

In a letter of March 2, 1877, Bell admitted to Gray that he was aware Gray's caveat "had something to do with the vibration of a wire in water [the variable resistance breakthrough that made the telephone practical] — and therefore conflicted with my patent." At this time, Gray's caveat was still confidential, although Gray had previously told Bell of the details of his liquid telephone design in late June 1876, while attending the Centennial Exhibition in Philadelphia. In 1879, Bell testified under oath that he discussed "in a general way" Gray's caveat with patent examiner Zenas Fisk Wilber. However, when patent examiners investigated possible interferences between applications, it was not uncommon for them to ask questions of the inventors directed at the places of possible interference, which is what Bell claimed happened.

In an affidavit from April 8, 1886, Wilber admitted that he was an alcoholic who owed money to his longtime friend and Civil War Army companion Marcellus Bailey, Bell's lawyer. Wilber says that after he issued the suspension on Bell's patent application, Bailey came to visit. In violation of Patent Office rules, he told Bailey about Gray's caveat and told his superiors that Bell's patent application had arrived first. During Bell's visit to Washington, "Prof. Bell was with me an hour when I showed him the drawing [of Gray's caveat] and explained Gray's methods to him." He says Bell returned at 2 pm to give him a hundred-dollar bill (equivalent to $3,000 in 2025).

Wilber's other affidavits leave out these details. Only his October 21, 1885 affidavit directly contradicts this story, and Wilber claims it was "given at the request of the Bell company by Mr. Swan, of its counsel" and he was "duped to sign it" while drunk and depressed. However, Wilber's April 8, 1886, affidavit was also sworn to and signed before Thomas W. Swan. These conflicting affidavits discredited Wilber.

Furthermore, the April 8 affidavit signed by Wilber had been drawn up for him by lawyers for the Pan-Electric Telephone Company, which at the time was being sued by Bell Telephone for patent infringement. In addition, the Pan-Electric Company was being investigated by the U.S. Congress for having given the U.S. Attorney General Augustus Garland 500,000 shares of Pan-Electric Telephone. Subsequently, Garland brought suit against Bell to annul the Bell patents. The Speaker of the House of Representatives appointed a special committee to investigate the Pan-Electric matter and Garland's actions.

The April 8 affidavit was published in the Washington Post on May 22, 1886. Three days later, the Post published a sworn denial from Bell, which was also reprinted in The Electrical World. Bell swore that he never gave any money to Wilber, and that "Mr. Wilber did not show me Gray's caveat of the drawing of it or any portion of either."

== Bell's background and use of liquid transmitters ==
The theory that Alexander Graham Bell stole the idea of the telephone rests on the similarity between drawings of liquid transmitters in his lab notebook of March 1876 to those of Gray's patent caveat of the previous month. However, there is extensive evidence that Bell had been using liquid transmitters in various experiments for over three years before that time. In 1875, Bell filed a patent application for a primitive fax machine which included drawings of multiple liquid transmitters and the Patent Office granted his application as Patent No. 161739 in April, 1875—ten months before Gray filed his telephone caveat. Experiments by Bell going back to his youth in Scotland show a steady, logical progression towards development of the telephone. Much of the documentation detailing these experiments includes drawings of liquid transmitters remarkably similar to the design which Bell is alleged to have stolen from Gray in 1876.

=== Early experiments and use of liquid transmitters, 1867–1873 ===
Bell had an important advantage over other inventors trying to develop a talking machine: he had been trained in phonetics and had a deep understanding of how human speech is produced by the mouth and how the ear processes sound. While electricians such as Reis, Gray and Edison used make-or-break currents (like a buzzer) in their attempts, Bell understood acoustics and wave theory and applied this knowledge to analogous work in his electrical experiments.

Bell's father, Alexander Melville Bell, had studied the production of speech and developed a way to transcribe all elements of human speech in a system called Visible Speech. (See example in Fig. 1.). Melville (who was a friend of George Bernard Shaw and a model for Prof. Henry Higgins in Pygmalion) frequently involved his son Aleck in his work and public demonstrations. The historian Edwin S. Grosvenor, while researching his biography of Bell, discovered lost drawings that the inventor had done as a young man to illustrate his own research into how the mouth formed components of vowel sounds (Fig. 2). Bell detected the pitches of vowels by placing tuning forks in his mouth and speaking. His research into sound production was considered significant enough that Bell was elected into membership in the prestigious London Philological Society at age 19.

Bell later recalled that "I commenced the study of Telegraphy with a friend in the city of Bath" in 1867. He began sending electric currents through tuning forks to transmit sounds through by wire, which he later learned had been anticipated by Helmholtz. "I came to believe firmly in the feasibility of the telegraphic transmission of speech," Bell wrote later, "and I used to tell my friends, that some day or other we should talk by telegraph."

In the winter of 1872–73, after emigrating to Boston, Bell became a professor of elocution at Boston University. He continued research into phonetics and resumed the electrical experiments he had begun in Bath and London towards improving the telegraph. Bell replicated and enlarged upon Helmholtz's tuning fork sounder experiments (see Fig. 3). These experiments involved running an electric current through a tuning fork attached to a wire that dipped in liquid as the fork vibrated. The tone of the fork was then replicated in another fork hooked up into the circuit. These experiments, with a vibrating wire touching a liquid, anticipated the liquid transmitter of Bell's telephone in March, 1876 three years later. (Compare Fig. 3 and Fig. 7, for example.)

Initially, Bell was trying to develop a telegraph capable of sending multiple messages simultaneously over the same wire. Most of these early experiments involved "liquid transmitters" based on the Helmholtz model. On November 9, 1874, Bell's friend and neighbor, P.D. Richards, wrote the inventor a letter at Bell's request describing the experiments and transmission of telegraphic messages over wires using a liquid transmitter filled with mercury. "You used tuning-forks; and a connection or circuit was made and broken by means of the vibrations of the form (according to its pitch) in a cup containing quicksilver," he recalled. Richards' letter including a drawing of the experiments (Fig. 4a).

A detail of this drawing (Fig. 4b) the experiments of early 1873 shows a liquid transmitter filled with mercury on the table.

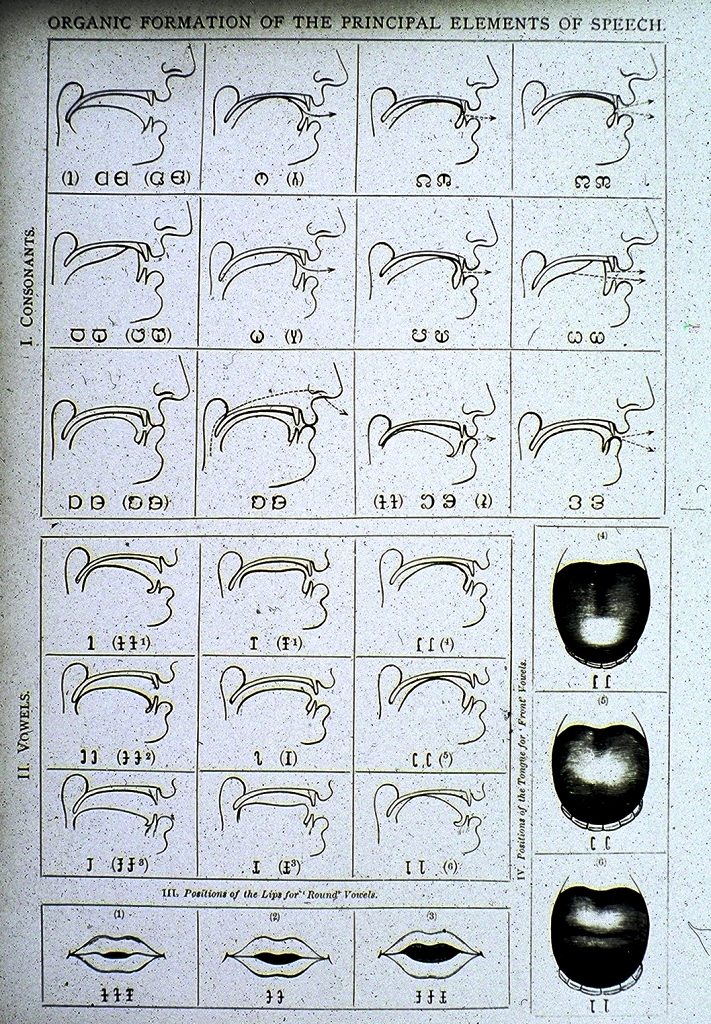
Fig. 1. Bell learned acoustics from his father, Alexander Melville Bell, who created diagrams of how the human mouth formed consonants and vowels for his book on Visible Speech.

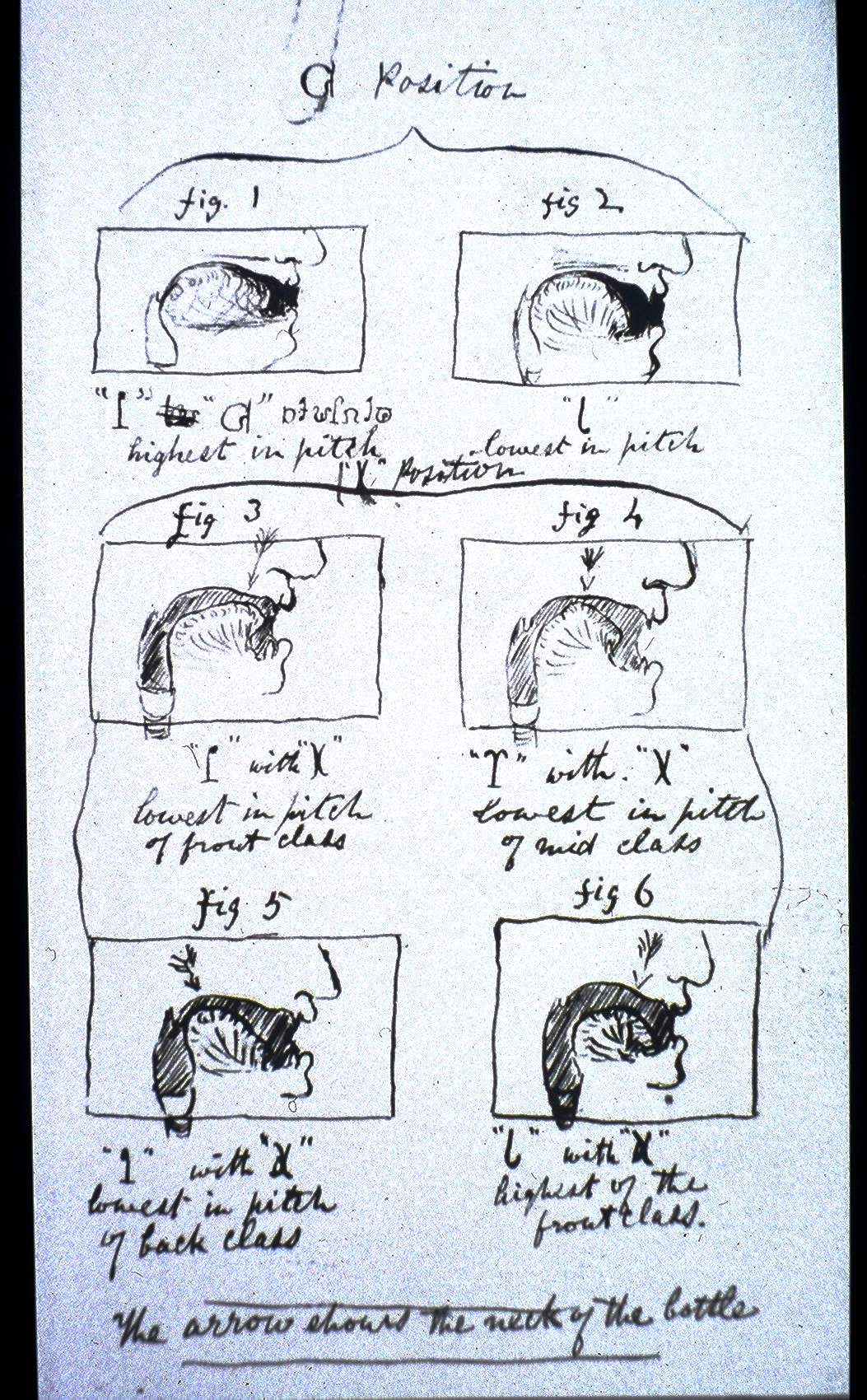
Fig. 2. Bell was aided in his telephone experiments by a thorough understanding of how human speech works. At the age of 19, he did primary research into the production of vowel sounds that was recognized as novel by leading philologists.

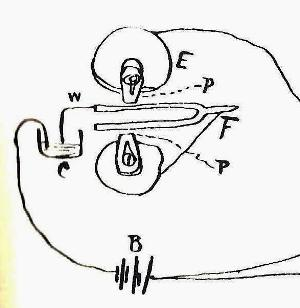
Fig. 3. Building on work by Helmholtz, Bell transmitted musical tones in 1872 using a tuning fork sounder, in which an electric current passed through a wire dipped into liquid in a cup (C) that was vibrated by the tuning fork.

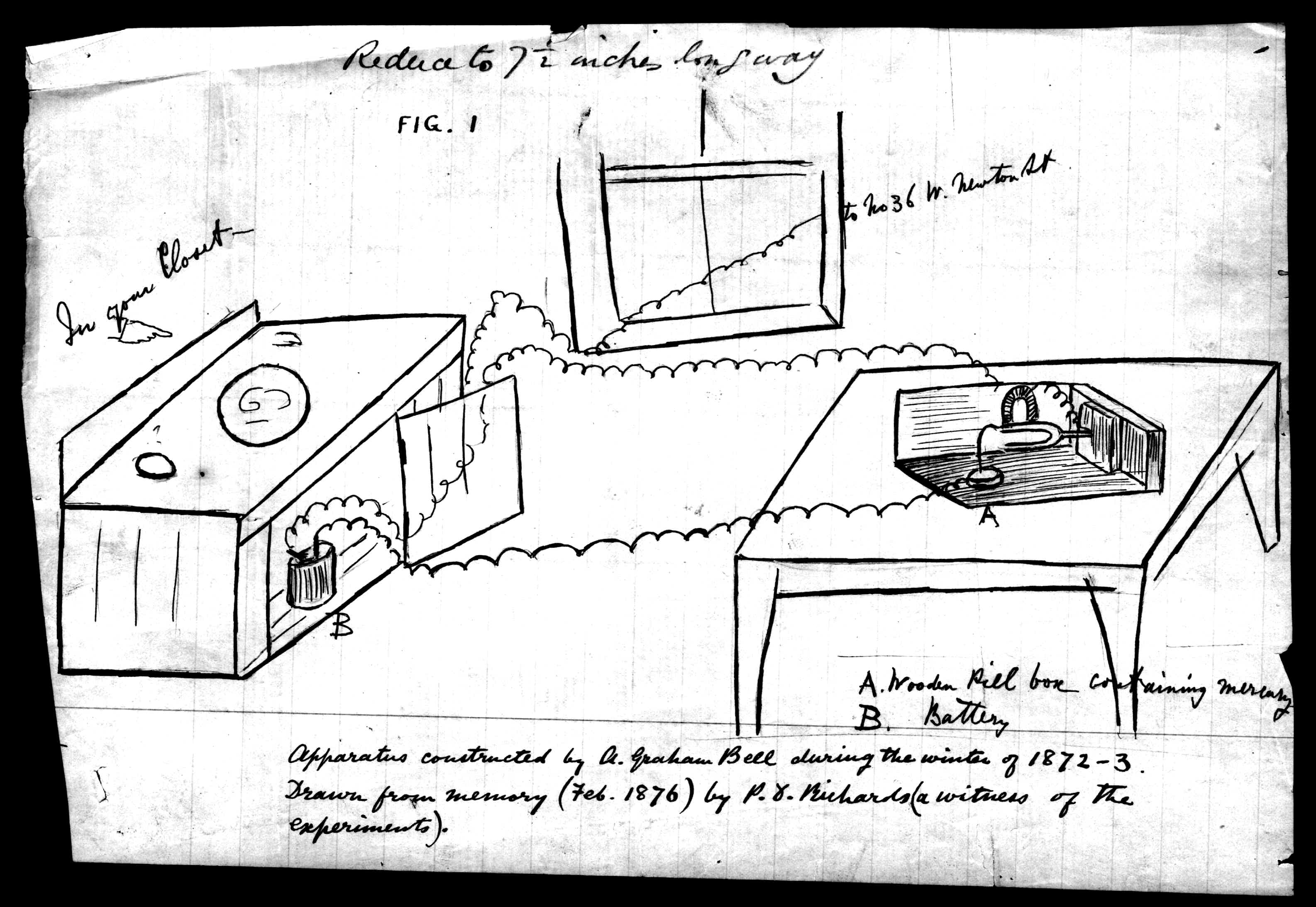
Fig. 4a. Bell's neighbor, P.D. Richards, drew a sketch on November 9, 1874, showing the experiments he had witnessed in which Bell sent telegraphic messages over wires using a liquid transmitter filled with mercury.

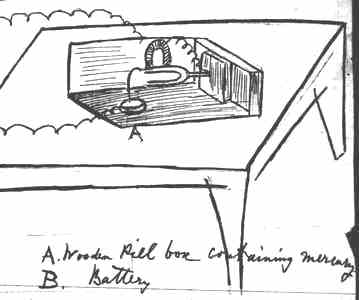
Fig. 4b. A detail from Richards's 1874 drawing shows Bell's use of a liquid transmitter, a pillbox filled with mercury and marked "A".

=== Use of liquid transmitters for telephone experiments, 1873–1876 ===
In 1873, Bell came to realize that his work on the multiple telegraphs could lead to a more important achievement: the transmission of the human voice by electricity. In October 1873, at his lab at 292 Essex Street in Boston, he began experimenting with vibrating metal strips or "reeds" to transmit speech. A drawing from the time (Fig. 5) shows the reed (R), which is set in motion by speaking into the mouthpiece or orifice (O). A platinum wire (P) attached to the reed (R) dips into a cup of liquid—in this case, mercury (M). The round mouthpiece that Bell spoke into was made of gutta-percha (gg). As the transmitting reed vibrated and dipped up and down in the liquid, it changed the strength and quality of the current.

In April 1875, the U.S. Patent Office granted Bell a patent for a primitive fax machine using a similar transmitter with liquid mercury. Bell's drawing for Patent # 161739 (Fig. 6a) for the fax machine, which he called the "autograph telegraph", showed multiple liquid transmitters. A detail of this patent drawing (Fig. 6b) shows two liquid transmitters each marked "Z".

Bell is alleged to have illicitly seen Gray's patent application of February 14, 1876, and then gone back to Boston and replicated it. However, his notebook drawings of March 1876, such as the one on March 8 (Fig. 7), are remarkably similar in both design and concept to his drawing over the previous three years. Similarly, his drawing of the liquid transmitter that transmitted the first human speech on March 10, 1876 (Fig. 8) is remarkably similar to his previous drawings.

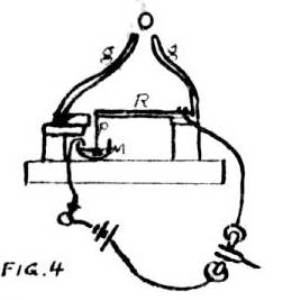
Fig. 5. Bell's experiments in October 1873 included a liquid transmitter, in this case, a small cup of liquid mercury (M).

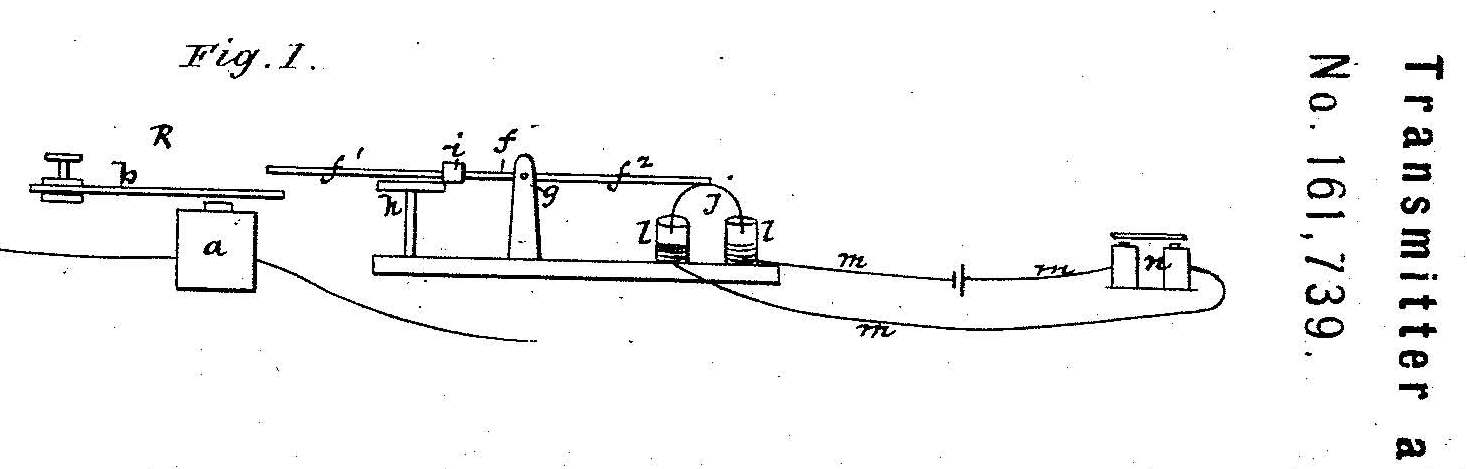
Fig. 6a. The U.S. Patent Office granted Patent No. 161739 in April 1875 to Bell for a primitive fax machine using liquid transmitters that he called the "autograph telegraph".

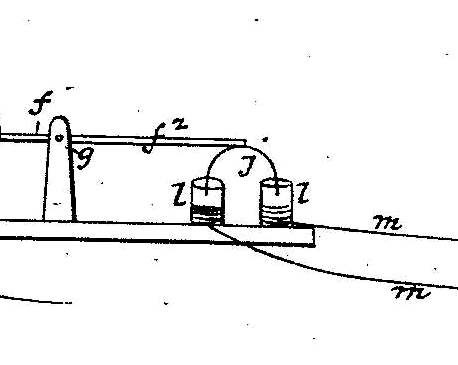
Fig. 6b. A detail of the drawing for the patent granted to Bell includes multiple liquid transmitters, which are labeled "Z".

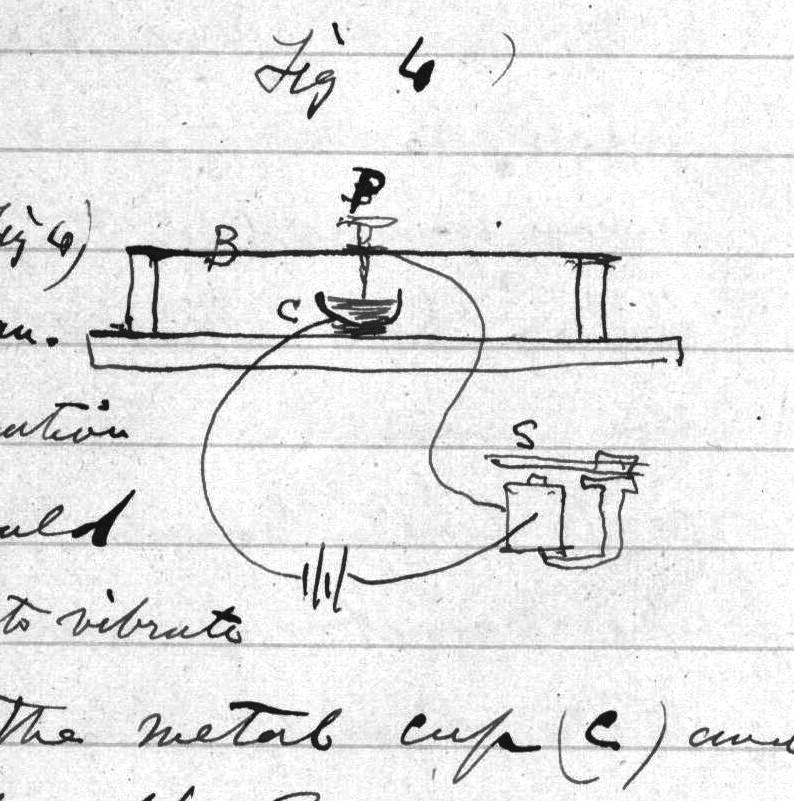
Fig. 7. A Bell drawing from March 8, 1876, that shows a liquid transmitter was witnessed by numerous individuals, who initialed Bell's notebook.

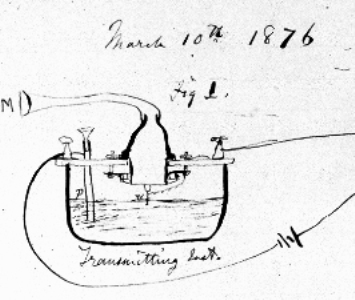
Fig. 8. Bell's drawing of the first telephone that successfully transmitted the human voice is remarkably similar to his drawings of the previous 3 1/2 years that used liquid transmitters.

== Conflicting theories ==
The courts decided priority in favor of Bell and the telephone company he founded. In addition to being constructed differently from the transmitter described and pictured in Gray's caveat, Bell's working liquid transmitter of March 10, 1876 operated in a way that is in fact described in Bell's original patent application, but not in Gray's caveat.

Gray supporters cite the fact that Bell's first successful experiment in transmitting clear speech over a wire was on March 10, 1876, using the same water transmitter design described in Gray's caveat but not described in Bell's patent. A book by Evenson, concludes that it was Bell's lawyers, not Bell, who misappropriated Gray's water transmitter (variable resistance) invention.

=== Important difference between Bell's patent application and Gray's application ===
The following quote forms part of the information that is found in the left margin of Bell's patent application, and is alleged by some to have been stolen from Gray's caveat:

"For instance, let mercury or some other liquid form part of a voltaic current, the more deeply the conducting-wire is immersed in the mercury or other liquid, the less resistance does the liquid offer to the passage of the current."

Though the advisability of using mercury in his device has been questioned, it is Bell's description of how the conducting-wire is immersed (more or less deeply), and the effect on electrical resistance that this does have on the passage of current in "other liquid", that proves his understanding of undulating current and variable resistance in this device, at the time of his patent application. This information, not found in Gray's caveat, is unlikely to have come from any other mind than Bell's, and Bell's supporters feel it is superior to Gray's description. Bell describes here the method with which his liquid transmitter of March 10, 1876, was built and operated.

Gray's caveat describes a liquid transmitter that entails two electrodes that are nearly, but not quite, touching. Both electrodes are submerged in the liquid, which had to be contained in an insulated vessel such as one of glass, as stated in the caveat. This is the device that Gray pictured in his caveat drawing.

Bell's liquid transmitter of March 10, 1876, was not built to the specifications contained in Gray's caveat, but rather to the specifications in Bell's patent application. The positioning of Bell's electrodes was radically different from those of Gray's caveat. Bell's electrodes were relatively far apart, one just touching the surface of the liquid and being acted upon in that position by the diaphragm responding to a human voice. It is this electrode that operated just as Bell described it in his patent application: "…the more deeply the conducting-wire is immersed in the mercury or other liquid, the less resistance does the liquid offer to the passage of the current." This is the device that is pictured in Bell's notebook entry of March 9 and which some have seen as being similar to that pictured in the Gray caveat. Though both devices are correctly called a liquid transmitter, they are in fact quite different.

Bell did not achieve a working liquid transmitter by developing the information contained in Gray's caveat. From the beginning of the experimentation which led to his working liquid transmitter, Bell was following his own vision, not that of Gray. This is seen in Bell's laboratory notebook entries, where the many drawings of tests that he and Thomas Watson conducted in the days preceding March 10, all show electrode placements similar to those of the eventual working transmitter.

Supreme Court testimony indicated that the device described and pictured in Gray's caveat would not work. Following his own vision and using the electrode placement described in his patent application, Bell had a working liquid transmitter on the third day of his and Watson's efforts. Bell supporters feel this proves that Bell not only had a good understanding of undulating current and variable resistance, but in fact, his knowledge was superior to that of Gray.

=== First to arrive at the patent office ===
Gardiner Hubbard, Bell's lead partner in what would become the Bell Telephone Company, had his lawyer file Bell's patent application for the telephone in the U.S. patent office in Washington, D.C., on February 14, 1876. Gray's lawyer filed Gray's caveat the same day. Under the U.S. patent laws of 1876 (and until 2011), a patent was granted to the first to invent and not to the first to file, and therefore it should not have made any difference whether Bell or Gray filed first. The popular belief was that Bell arrived at the patent office an hour or two before his rival Elisha Gray, and that Gray lost his rights to the telephone as a result. That did not happen, according to Evenson.

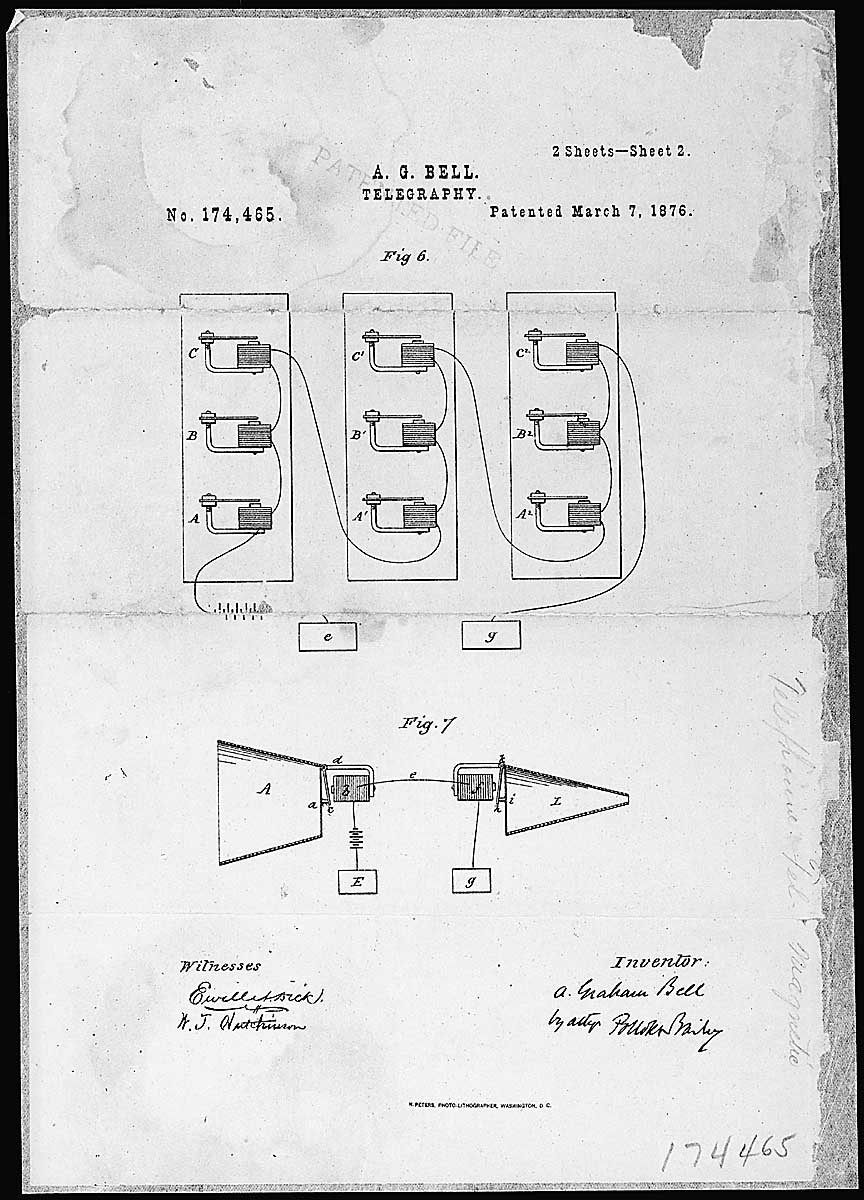
Alexander Graham Bell's Telephone Patent Drawing, 1876

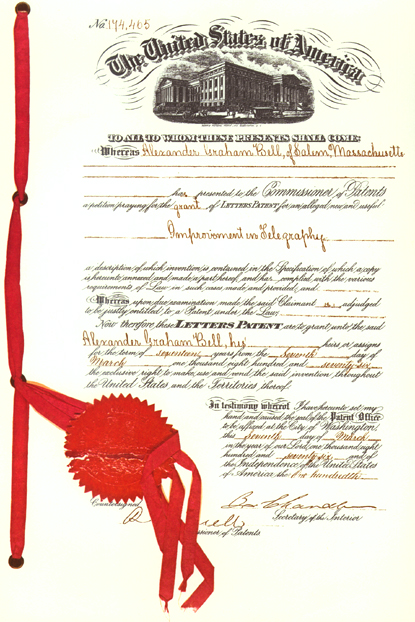
The master telephone patent, 174465, granted to Bell, March 7, 1876

According to Gray's account, his patent caveat was taken to the US patent office a few hours before Bell's application, shortly after the patent office opened, and remained near the bottom of the in-basket until that afternoon. Bell's application was filed shortly before noon on February 14 by Bell's lawyer who requested that the filing fee be entered immediately onto the cash receipts blotter and that Bell's application be taken to the examiner immediately. Late that afternoon, the fee for Gray's caveat was entered on the cash blotter, but the caveat was not taken to the examiner until the following day. The fact that Bell's filing fee was recorded earlier than Gray's fee led to the story that Bell had arrived at the patent office earlier. Bell was in Boston on February 14 and did not know this had happened until he arrived in Washington on February 26.

On February 19, Zenas Fisk Wilber, the patent examiner for both Bell's application and Gray's caveat, noticed that Bell's application claimed the same variable resistance feature described in Gray's caveat, and both described an invention for "transmitting vocal sounds". Wilber suspended Bell's application for 3 months to allow Gray to file a full patent application with a request for examination.

Gray's lawyer William D. Baldwin had been told that Bell's application had been notarized on January 20, 1876. Baldwin advised Gray and Gray's sponsor Samuel S. White to abandon the caveat and not to file a patent application for the telephone. Whether Bell's application was filed before or after Gray's caveat no longer mattered, because Gray abandoned his caveat and did not contest Bell's priority, which resulted in Bell being granted U.S. patent 174,465 for the telephone on March 7, 1876.

=== Conspiracy theories ===
Several conspiracy theories were presented during trials and appeals (1878–1888) in which the Bell Telephone Company sued competitors and later when Bell and his lawyers were accused of patent fraud. These theories were based on alleged corruption of the patent examiner Zenas Wilber who was an alcoholic. Wilber was accused of revealing secret information to Alexander Graham Bell and Bell's patent attorneys Anthony Pollok and Marcellus Bailey from patent applications and caveats of Bell's competitor Elisha Gray. One of the accusers was attorney Lysander Hill who charged that Bell's attorneys, Pollok and Bailey, had received this secret information from Wilber and that Wilber allowed Bell's attorney to insert a paragraph of seven sentences, based on this secret information, into Bell's patent application after both Gray's caveat and Bell's patent application had been filed in the patent office. However, Bell's original patent application shows no sign of alteration. Wilber noticed that the seven sentences contained subject matter very similar to the ideas expressed in Gray's caveat and suspended both Bell's application and Gray's caveat, which he would not have done if the seven sentences had not been in Bell's original patent application as filed on February 14, 1876. The conspiracy theories were rejected by the courts.

One of the valuable claims in Bell's 1876 US patent 174,465 was Claim 4, a method of producing variable electric current in a circuit by varying the resistance in the circuit. That feature was not shown in any of Bell's patent drawings, but was shown in Elisha Gray's drawings in his caveat filed the same day. A description of the variable resistance feature, consisting of the seven sentences, was inserted into a draft of Bell's application. That the seven sentences were inserted in Bell's draft is not disputed. Bell testified that he inserted the seven sentences "almost at the last moment before sending it off to Washington to be engrossed." He said the engrossed application (also called the "fair copy") was mailed to him from his lawyers on January 18, 1876, and that he signed it and had it notarized in Boston on January 20. But this statement by Bell is disputed by Evenson, who argues that the seven sentences and Claim 4 were inserted into Bell's patent application without Bell's knowledge on February 13 or 14, just before Bell's application was hand carried to the Patent Office by one of Bell's lawyers.

=== Role of the patent attorneys ===
Evenson argues that it was not Wilber who leaked Gray's ideas to Bell's attorney Anthony Pollok after Gray's caveat was filed with the patent office, but somebody in the office of Gray's attorney William D. Baldwin, perhaps Baldwin himself, who leaked the variable resistance idea and the water transmitter idea to Bell's attorney before Gray's caveat and Bell's application were filed. It was Baldwin who advised Gray to abandon his caveat and not turn it into a patent application, because, Baldwin said, Bell had invented the telephone before Gray and Bell's application was notarized before Gray began his caveat. Baldwin urged Gray to write a letter to Bell congratulating him on his new telephone invention and "I do not claim even the credit of inventing it...”. Baldwin also failed to represent Gray's interests in the Dowd case. Baldwin was on the payroll of the Bell Telephone Company at the same time he was representing Gray in a patent office action involving the Bell company. Gray did not tell anybody about his new invention for transmitting voice sounds until Friday, February 11, 1876, when Gray requested that Baldwin prepare a caveat for filing. Sometime on the weekend of February 12–13, Bell's lawyers learned of Gray's caveat. They then rushed to get Bell's application filed on Monday before Gray's caveat, or to make it appear that Bell's application was filed first.

There were several versions of Bell's application:

- version E: draft consisting of 10 pages that Bell gave to George Brown for filing in England.
- version F: draft consisting of 10 pages sent by Bell to Pollok & Bailey in early January 1876.
- version X: engrossed "fair copy" signed by Bell and notarized on January 20, 1876 (presumably 14 pages)
- version G: final application consisting of 15 pages filed in the US Patent Office on February 14, 1876. After minor amendments were made, this version G was issued as a patent on March 7, 1876.

Versions E and F are almost identical except for minor changes and the seven sentence insertion that now appears in the margin of version F, page 6. The question is when was this insertion made. Evenson argues that the seven sentences were not in version E or F when Bell sent version F to Pollok in early January 1876. Pollok rewrote the claims on page 10 of version F and his clerk copied version F into an engrossed "fair copy" (version X) which Pollok sent to Bell. On January 20, Bell signed the last page of version X, had it notarized on the last page, and returned it to Pollok with instructions to hold it until Bell received a message from George Brown. There was probably no page number on the notarized page when it was notarized. Both the draft version F and the notarized version X remained in Pollok's file box.

=== Valentine's Day ===
According to Evenson, early on Monday, February 14, after learning of the variable resistance feature from Gray's lawyer, Pollok or Bailey inserted the seven sentences into version X, revised the claims, made other minor revisions, and had the clerk prepare a new engrossed fair copy, version G which consists of 14 pages, not including a signature page. Pollok or Bailey removed the unnumbered notarized signature page from version X and attached it to version G, wrote page number "15" at the bottom of the notarized page, and hand carried the application to the patent office before noon on February 14. The page number 15 on the notarized page is more than twice as large as page numbers on pages 10 through 14. The inserted seven sentences are at the top of page 9 and the page number 9 is twice as large as page numbers on pages 10 through 14. Evenson does not speculate about what Pollok did with the pages of version X that were replaced by version G. Version F still lacked the seven sentence insertion. When Bell arrived in Washington on February 26, 1876, Pollok apparently requested that Bell write the seven sentences and other changes onto version F in Bell's handwriting, thereby creating a draft containing the variable resistance feature that Bell could later testify was made before January 18, 1876 "almost at the last moment" before sending version F to his lawyers.

=== Questions of theft ===
The "smoking gun" that proved that Bell had illegally acquired knowledge of Gray's invention from examiner Wilber prior to filing of Bell's patent application concerns similar sketches of a liquid transmitter design that Gray and Bell's applications both contained. Some writers believe that the paper trail left by various drafts of Bell's patent application is evidence that his lawyers may have acquired the basic ideas of Gray's liquid transmitter which Bell then used successfully to transmit "Mr. Watson, come here, I want to see you" on March 10, 1876.

Gray wrote to Bell saying: "I was unfortunate in being an hour or two behind you." Gray changed his opinion after learning facts from the trials. Gray wrote that his caveat was filed first: "Whatever evidence there is, is in favor of the caveat having been filed first."

In commenting on letters Gray and Bell wrote to each other before the trials, Gray wrote "Two or three letters passed and in one of them I told him of the caveat. In his [Bell's] answer he said, 'I do not know about your caveat, except that it had something to do with a wire vibrating in water', or words to that effect. 'Vibrating in water' was the whole thing. How would he know that much?" About his caveat, Gray wrote "I showed Bell how to make the telephone. He could not mistake it, because the drawings were explicit, as well as the specifications."

Ten years after Bell's patent was issued, patent examiner Zenas Wilber claimed in an affidavit that he had taken a $100 bribe from Bell, had taken a "loan" from Bell's patent attorney, and showed Bell the drawings in Gray's caveat.

However, this affidavit was drafted for Wilber's signature by attorneys for a telephone company attempting to steal the Bell Telephone patents. Historian Robert Bruce believed that Wilber, who at the time was near the end of his life, ill, and destitute, was "probably liquored up or bribed, or both."

Bell responded with his own affidavit that he had never paid any money to Wilber and Wilber did not show the drawings or any part of Gray's caveat to Bell. Bell testified that he visited Wilber before the patent was granted and asked Wilber what part of his application conflicted with Gray's caveat. Wilber told Bell that the conflict was with his use of variable resistance to cause undulating current and pointed to those words in Bell's application. Wilber suggested that Bell make several amendments to his application that eliminated the conflict and Bell complied. Examiner Wilber then approved Bell's patent which was issued on March 3, 1876.

One week later, Bell built and successfully tested Gray's liquid transmitter which transmitted "Mr. Watson, come here, I want to see you" on March 10, 1876.

Some writers continue to accuse Bell of stealing the telephone from Gray, Evenson claims that Bell tested Gray's water transmitter design only after Bell's patent was granted and only as a proof of concept scientific experiment to prove to his own satisfaction that intelligible "articulate speech" (Bell's words) could be electrically transmitted.

Some claim that evidence exists in the Library of Congress and the U.S. Patent Office that Bell had used liquid transmitters from the time of his first electrical experiments in England in 1867 (in which he improved on the tuning fork sounder invented by Helmholtz that send musical tones over a wire using a liquid transmitter). However, much of this evidence is based on reports from a neighbor who made these claims after 1876, when knowledge of the transmitter had already been stolen from Gray. For some examples of these transmitters, see Figures 3, 4a, 4b, and 5 above, as well as the drawings for Bell's 1875 patent, 6a and 6b.

After March 1876, Bell focused on improving the electromagnetic telephone and never used Gray's liquid transmitter in public demonstrations or commercial use.

When Gray applied for a patent for the variable resistance telephone transmitter, Burton Baker claims that the Patent Office determined "while Gray was undoubtedly the first to conceive of and disclose the [variable resistance] invention, as in his caveat of 14 February 1876, his failure to take any action amounting to completion until others had demonstrated the utility of the invention deprives him of the right to have it considered."

However, Bell wrote his wife Mabel in March 1901, after several newspaper articles revived the controversy after the death of Gray, that:

...he went down to his grave with the idea that he had shown me how to make the telephone, in quite forgetfulness of the fact that the specifications for my patent had been prepared in 1875 and had been for a long time in the hands of Messrs. Pollock & Bailey in Washington by whom the papers were forwarded to me in Boston to be sworn to and that they were sworn to there in January 1876. All this, of course, came out in the evidence. It also came out that Elisha Gray only obtained the idea which he incorporated in his caveat the same day it was written and that it was written the day it was filed, viz: Feb. 14, 1876, the same day my long delayed specification was filed in the Patent Office.

However, even the Supreme Court Case was mired in corruption. Chief Justice Morrison Waite's decision regarding the telephone cases was heavily influenced by the fact that the charge of Bell's theft "involves the professional integrity and moral character of eminent attorneys." In other words, his decision was based on the reputations of attorneys (whom he knew) rather than the facts of the case. Such corruption was business as usual in this era, a time when money and political machines influenced the courts.

== In popular culture ==
In a November 2015 episode of Drunk History, this controversy was reenacted with Martin Starr as Alexander Graham Bell, Henry Winkler as Wilber, and Jason Ritter as Elisha Gray. This reenactment claimed that Alexander Graham Bell definitely stole the necessary knowledge from the examiner Wilber, and that Graham Bell was a villain who stole all of the glory whilst Gray was the real inventor. None of the vagaries of this controversy were discussed in any depth.

== See also ==
- Bell Telephone Memorial
- Marcellus Bailey
- Emile Berliner
- Thomas Edison
- Antonio Meucci
- Anthony Pollok
- Philipp Reis
- Invention of the telephone
- The Telephone Cases of the US Supreme Court
