= Daniel Drawbaugh =

American purported inventor

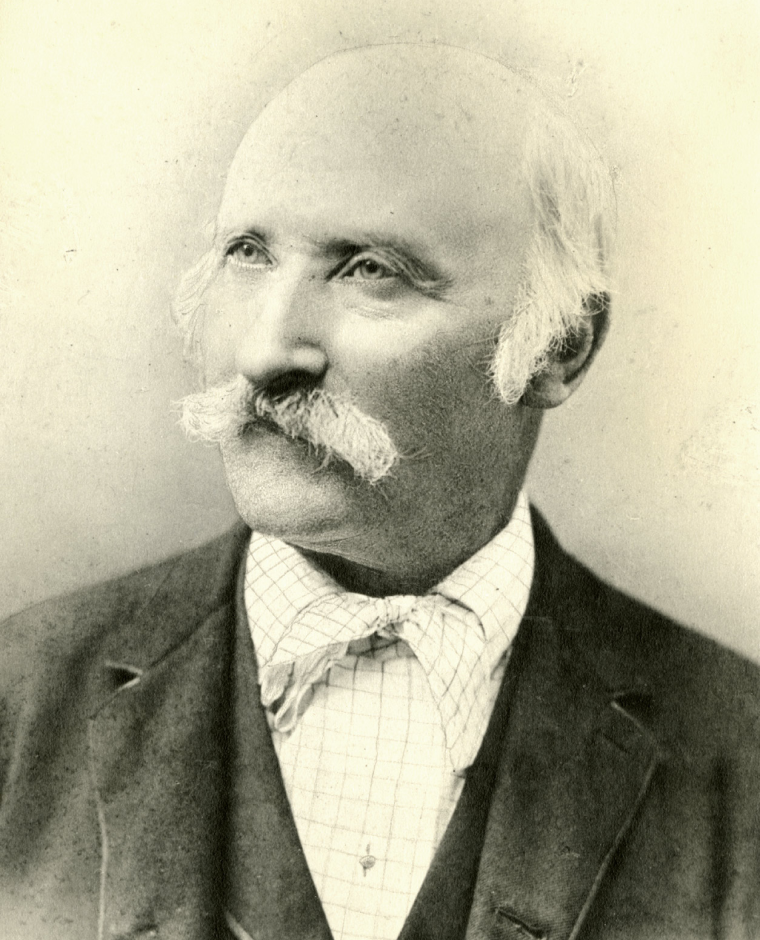
- Born: 14.07.1827
- Died: 2.11.1911
- Citizenship: USA

Daniel Drawbaugh (July 14, 1827 – November 2, 1911) was a purported inventor of the telephone for which he sought a patent in 1880. His claims were contested by the Bell Telephone Company, which won a court decision in 1888.

Described as a bearded rustic tinkerer from Yellow Breeches Creek, Pennsylvania, he claimed to have invented a telephone using a teacup as a transmitter as early as 1867, but had been too poor to patent it then. In a lower court his case was well-financed by the People’s Telephone Co. and brilliantly argued in court by Lysander Hill. But he “blew it” by drawling in court "I don’t remember how I came to it. I had been experimenting in that direction. I don’t remember of getting at it by accident either. I don’t remember of anyone talking to me of it." The lower court findings were confirmed by the Supreme Court in 1888, as noted in The Telephone Cases. Drawbaugh was an opponent of Marconi as well. Right after Marconi's success several entrepreneurs tried to take over wireless telegraph, using Drawbaugh and his inventions.

Drawbaugh was born on July 14, 1827, in Cumberland County's Eberley's Mills which is just outside Harrisburg, Pennsylvania. In 1854 he married Elcetta Thompson. In 1856 Daniel started mutual enterprise with his landlord Christian Eberly and he was obliged to share profits. According to his obituary printed in the New York Times on November 4, 1911, he invented many appliances, for example: stave jointing machine, pneumatic tools, hydraulic rams, folding lunch boxes, coin separators and even is said to have invented a wireless phone that could be used 4 miles away. He died November 2, 1911, in his laboratory while working on a wireless burglar alarm. Many of his surviving York County relatives attended a ceremony to dedicate a historical marker located at the site of the inventor's workshop and home in 1965.
