= Marcellus Bailey =

American lawyer (1840–1921)

Marcellus Bailey (1840 – January 16, 1921) was an American patent attorney who, with Anthony Pollok, helped prepare Alexander Graham Bell's patents for the telephone and related inventions.

== Biography ==
The son of abolitionist and National Era editor Gamaliel Bailey, Marcellus Bailey was born in Cincinnati, Ohio, and was a major in the Union Army during the Civil War. After the war he studied law at the Columbian College Law Department (now the George Washington University Law School), and graduated in 1866.

Bailey became a patent attorney and continued his patent law practice for almost 55 years until his death. When Alexander Graham Bell began work on the telephone, Bailey was a partner of patent attorney Anthony Pollok in the law firm of Pollok & Bailey. Bell's patron and future father-in-law Gardiner Hubbard paid Pollok and Bailey to work on Bell's patent applications and patents.

Bailey was a founding member of the Metropolitan Club, and President of the Alibi Club.

The Alexander Graham Bell Papers collection at the Library of Congress contain letters from Bell to Pollok and Bailey regarding Bell's patents for the telephone.

Bailey died in Washington, D.C., on January 16, 1921 and is buried in the Oak Hill Cemetery in Georgetown.

== Some patents that Pollok & Bailey prosecuted ==
- U.S. patent 363,320 issued May 17, 1887, basic patent for arc welding, inventors Benardos & Olszewski
- U.S. patent 161,739 Improvement in Transmitters and Receivers for Electric Telegraphs, Bell patent filed March 6, 1875, issued April 1875 (multiplexing signals on a single wire)
- U.S. patent 174,465 Improvement in Telegraphy, Bell patent filed February 14, 1876, issued March 7, 1876 (Bell's first telephone patent)
- U.S. patent 178,399 Improvement in Telephonic Telegraph Receivers, Bell patent filed April 1876, issued June 1876
- U.S. patent 181,553 Improvement in Generating Electric Currents Bell patent filed August 1876, issued August 1876
- U.S. patent 186,787 Electric Telegraphy Bell patent filed January 15, 1877, issued January 30, 1877

== See also ==
- Alexander Graham Bell
- Bell Telephone Memorial
- Anthony Pollok
- Elisha Gray and Alexander Bell telephone controversy
