= The Telephone Cases =

- Supreme Court of the United States

Argued January 24–28, 31, February 1–4, 7–8, 1887 Decided March 19, 1888
- Full case name: Dolbear v. American Bell Telephone Company; Molecular Telephone Company v. American Bell Telephone Company; American Bell Telephone Company v. Molecular Telephone Company; Clay Commercial Telephone Company v. American Bell Telephone Company; People's Telephone Company v. American Bell Telephone Company; Overland Telephone Company v. American Bell Telephone Company
- Citations: 126 U.S. 1 (more) 8 S. Ct. 778; 31 L. Ed. 863

Holding
- The Bell Company patent was valid.

Court membership
- Chief Justice Morrison Waite Associate Justices Samuel F. Miller · Stephen J. Field; Joseph P. Bradley · John M. Harlan; Stanley Matthews · Horace Gray; Samuel Blatchford · Lucius Q. C. Lamar II

Case opinions
- Majority: Waite, joined by Miller, Matthews, Blatchford
- Dissent: Bradley, joined by Field, Harlan
- Gray and Lamar took no part in the consideration or decision of the case.

The Telephone Cases, 126 U.S. 1 (1888), were a series of U.S. court cases in the 1870s and the 1880s related to the invention of the telephone, which culminated in an 1888 decision of the U.S. Supreme Court that upheld the priority of the patents belonging to Alexander Graham Bell. Those patents were used by the American Bell Telephone Company and the Bell System, although they had also acquired critical microphone patents from Emile Berliner.

The objector (or plaintiff) in the Supreme Court case was initially the Western Union telegraph company, which was then a far-larger and better financed competitor than American Bell Telephone. Western Union advocated several more recent patent claims of Daniel Drawbaugh, Elisha Gray, Antonio Meucci, and Philip Reis in a bid to invalidate Alexander Graham Bell's master and subsidiary telephone patents dating from March 1876. A decision for Western Union would have immediately destroyed the Bell Telephone Company, and might have allowed the former company, instead of the latter, to become the world's largest telecommunications monopoly.

The Supreme Court came within one vote of overturning the Bell patent because of the eloquence of lawyer Lysander Hill for the Peoples Telephone Company. In a lower court, the Peoples Telephone Company stock rose briefly during the early proceedings but dropped after its claimant, Daniel Drawbaugh, took the stand and testified: "I don't remember how I came to it. I had been experimenting in that direction. I don't remember of getting at it by accident either. I don't remember of anyone talking to me of it."

In the case, the Supreme Court affirmed:

- Dolbear v. American Bell Tel. Co., 15 F. 448, 17 F. 604,
- Molecular Tel. Co. v. American Bell Tel. Co., 32 F. 214, and
- People's Tel. Co. v. American Bell Tel. Co., 22 F. 309 and 25 F. 725.

The Supreme Court reversed American Bell Tel Co. v. Molecular Tel. Co., 32 F. 214.

Bell's second fundamental patent expired on January 30, 1894, when the gates were then opened to independent telephone companies to compete with the Bell System. In all, the American Bell Telephone Company and its successor, AT&T, litigated 587 court challenges to its patents, including five that went to the US Supreme Court and, aside from two minor contract lawsuits, never lost a single case that was concluded with a final stage judgment.

== Size ==
The Court's decision in the Telephone Cases is notable for the size of the opinions delivered; together, they occupy the entire 126th volume of the United States Reports.

== Notable cases ==
Among the notable court cases involving the Bell Telephone Company, later renamed to the American Bell Telephone Company, were those related to challenges by Elisha Gray, a principal in Western Electric, as depicted in the Elisha Gray and Alexander Bell telephone controversy.

Additionally the Bell Company became embroiled in a number of challenges from those companies associated with Antonio Meucci, as shown in the Canadian Parliamentary Motion on Alexander Graham Bell, itself a response to the United States HRes. 269 on Antonio Meucci.

== See also ==
- Elisha Gray and Alexander Bell telephone controversy
