= Acoustic telegraphy =

Attempt at multiplexing Morse code messages by assigning them different sounds

Acoustic telegraphy (also known as harmonic telegraphy) was a name for various methods of multiplexing (transmitting more than one) telegraph messages simultaneously over a single telegraph wire by using different audio frequencies or channels for each message. A telegrapher used a conventional Morse key to tap out the message in Morse code. The key pulses were transmitted as pulses of a specific audio frequency. At the receiving end a device tuned to the same frequency resonated to the pulses but not to others on the same wire.

Inventors who worked on the acoustic telegraph included Charles Bourseul, Thomas Edison, Elisha Gray, and Alexander Graham Bell. Their efforts to develop acoustic telegraphy, in order to reduce the cost of telegraph service, led to the invention of the telephone.

Some of Thomas Edison's devices used multiple synchronized tuning forks tuned to selected audio frequencies and which opened and closed electrical circuits at the selected audio frequencies. Acoustic telegraphy was similar in concept to present-day FDMA, or frequency-division multiple access, used with radio frequencies.

The word acoustic comes from the Greek akoustikos meaning hearing, as with hearing of sound waves in air. Acoustic telegraphy devices were electromechanical and made musical or buzzing or humming sound waves in air for a few feet. But the primary function of these devices was not to generate sound waves, but rather to generate alternating electrical currents at selected audio frequencies in wires which transmitted telegraphic messages electrically over long distances.

== Patents ==
- U.S. patent 0,161,739 – Improvement in Transmitters and Receivers for Electric Telegraphs – Alexander Graham Bell, issued April 6, 1875
- U.S. patent 0,166,095 – Electrical Telegraph for Transmitting Musical Tones – Elisha Gray, issued July 27, 1875; Reissue # 8559 Jan. 28, 1879
- U.S. patent 0,173,618 – Improvement In Electro-Harmonic Telegraphs – Elisha Gray, issued February 15, 1876
- U.S. patent 0,182,996 – Acoustic Telegraph – Thomas Edison, issued October 10, 1876
- U.S. patent 0,185,507 – Improvement in electro-haronic multiplex telegraphs – Thomas Edison, issued December 19, 1876
- U.S. patent 0,186,330 – Acoustic Electric Telegraphs – Thomas Edison, issued January 16, 1877
- U.S. patent 0,200,993 – Acoustic Telegraphs – Thomas Edison, issued March 5, 1878
- U.S. patent 0,203,019 – Circuits for Acoustic or Telephonic Telegraphs – Thomas Edison, issued April 30, 1878
- U.S. patent 0,235,142 – Acoustic Telegraph – Thomas Edison, issued December 7, 1880

The five Edison patents were assigned to Western Union Telegraph Company of New York.

== See also ==
- Telegraph
- Invention of the telephone
