= Water microphone =

Electroacoustic device which generates a varying current in acidulated water

A water microphone or water transmitter is based on Ohm's law that current in a wire varies inversely with the resistance of the circuit. The sound waves from a human voice cause a diaphragm to vibrate, which causes a needle or rod to vibrate up and down in water that has been made conductive by a small amount of acid. As the needle or rod vibrates up and down in the water, the resistance of the water fluctuates, which causes an alternating current in the circuit. For this to work, the resistance of the water must vary substantially over the short distance the needle or rod vibrates. Acidulated water works well because only a small amount of acid is added. If one millimeter of acidulated water has a resistance of 100 ohms, two millimeters would have 200 ohms, which would produce enough alternating current to transmit audio signals in thousands of feet of wire. Mercury will not work because the resistance of one millimeter of mercury is less than a tenth of an ohm, and the vibration of a needle in mercury would produce a negligible alternating current.

Elisha Gray reasoned that a metal rod vibrating up and down in acidulated water would alternately lengthen and shorten the small distance between the bottom end of the rod and a metal plate at the bottom of the glass container holding the water. This is the invention described in Gray's caveat. When Alexander Bell's lawyer heard that Gray had described a vibrating rod in a liquid to vary the resistance, he added a claim for variable resistance in a draft of Bell's unfiled patent application and added an additional seven sentences that mentioned mercury as the liquid. The lawyer knew that Bell had experimented with a wire dipped in mercury to provide a flexible electrical switch.

On March 10, 1876, when Bell and Watson tested their first successful water transmitter, Bell used a needle in the water to minimize the inertial mass moved by the diaphragm and relied on variable resistance in the meniscus of the water on the needle. The depth of the needle made little difference.

Other minor variations and improvements were made to the liquid microphone by Majoranna, Chambers, Vanni, Sykes, and Elisha Gray.

Although the water microphone was commercially impractical, the variable resistance feature inspired Thomas Edison to experiment with dry carbon (graphite and amorphous) to provide the variable resistance. The Edison transmitter with later improvements was used for more than 60 years.

== See also ==
- Microphone
- Hydrophone
- Invention of the telephone
