= List of patent attorneys and agents =

This is a list of notable patent attorneys and agents, including, in the section below, fictional patent attorneys.

== A ==
- Charles Denton Abel (1831–1906), first vice-president of the Chartered Institute of Patent Attorneys

== B ==
- Marcellus Bailey (1840–1921), 1870s U.S. law partner of Anthony Pollok who prepared telephone patents for Alexander Graham Bell
- Alfred Ely Beach (1826–1896), inventor of the New York City Subway
- Sharon Bowles (born 1953), British MEP

== C ==
- Chester Carlson (1906–1968)
- William Percy Carpmael (1853–1936), founder and first president of the rugby union Barbarian Football Club
- Yardley Chittick (1900–2008)
- Dennis Crouch (born 1975), professor at the University of Missouri School of Law and author of the widely read patent law blog Patently-O
- George Ticknor Curtis (1812–1894)

== D ==
- George Alfred DePenning, inventor to whom the first Indian patent was granted in 1856, and who later became the first patent agent in India
- Peter Detkin of Intellectual Ventures
- Joel S. Douglas, inventor that pioneered the first alternate-site glucose meter used to treat diabetes patients.

== E ==
- Victor J. Evans, founder of large US patent firm of the 1910s-20s, focused on aviation, art collector

== F ==
- Frederick Perry Fish, one of the leading patent attorneys in the late 19th century in America representing numerous high-profile clients from the Wright Brothers, General Electric, AT&T, founder of the intellectual property firm Fish & Richardson
- Richard Frenkel, once-anonymous author of the Patent Troll Tracker blog

== G ==
- Andrew C. Greenberg, co-creator of the Wizardry computer game
- Edith Julia Griswold, in her day, she was the only woman patent expert

== H ==
- G. Donald Harrison (1889–1956), builder of music organs
- Walter de Havilland (1872–1968), father of film stars Olivia de Havilland and Joan Fontaine.
- Ralph Horween (1896–1997), Harvard Crimson and NFL football player
- Gerald D. Hosier, patent litigator, named highest-paid attorney by Forbes magazine in 2000

== I ==
- John Imray (1820–1902), second president of the Chartered Institute of Patent Attorneys

== J ==
- John Henry Johnson (1828–1900), first president of the Chartered Institute of Patent Attorneys

== K ==
- Naoto Kan, Prime Minister of Japan (2010–2011)
- William ("Bill") Keefauver, formerly chief patent lawyer for Bell Labs; responsible for Gottschalk v. Benson, test case in which Bell Labs attempted (unsuccessfully) to get patent on algorithm; later Vice President and General Counsel of AT&T Bell Laboratories and Corporate Vice President – Law of AT&T with responsibility for intellectual property law matters
- Florence King (1870–1924), first female patent attorney in America
- Stephan Kinsella (born 1965), Libertarian legal theorist

== L ==
- Otto Lee, mayor of Sunnyvale

== M ==
- Alan MacPherson (1934–2008), the "dean of patent law" in Silicon Valley
- Howard T. Markey (1921–2006), Chief Judge Court of Appeals for the Federal Circuit, Chicago patent lawyer, major general Air Force Reserve test pilot in World War II

== N ==
- William Newton (1786–1861), one of the earliest recorded patent agents practising in London

== P ==
- Anthony Pollok (1829–1898), 1870s US law partner of Marcellus Bailey who prepared telephone patents for Alexander Graham Bell

== R ==
- Daniel Ravicher, Senior Counsel to the Free Software Foundation
- Greg "Fossilman" Raymer (born 1964), winner of the main event at the 2004 World Series of Poker
- Giles Sutherland Rich (1904–1999)
- Malcolm Royal (1941–2006), Australian patent attorney and educator

== S ==
- Richard H. Stern (born 1931), Chief of U.S. Justice Department Patent Sec. (1970–1979), of counsel to government in Aro Mfg. Co. v. Convertible Top Replacement Co., Lear, Inc. v. Adkins, Gottschalk v. Benson, United States v. Glaxo Group Ltd., Dann v. Johnston, Parker v. Flook. Professorial Lecturer in Law, George Washington University Law School (since 1990).

== T ==
- Harry Aubrey Toulmin, Sr. (1858–1942)

== V ==
- Vriesendorp & Gaade, Dutch patent lawyers

== W ==
- Günter Wächtershäuser, origin of life theorist
- Thomas Blanco White, British patent lawyer; inductee to the IP (Intellectual property) Hall of Fame in 2010
- Warren Woessner, poet and named partner of Schwegman, Lundberg & Woessner, P.A.

== Fictional characters who are patent attorneys ==
- Jim Eisenberg, played by Adam Arkin in the TV miniseries A Year in the Life
- Oliver Farnsworth, from the novel The Man Who Fell to Earth; played by Buck Henry in its film adaptation, of the same name
- Harriet Korn, played by Kathy Bates, of Harry's Law, a recently fired patent lawyer
- Wally Mason, in the book Notes of a Patent Attorney: The Wally Mason Stories by Brian C. Coad
- Eustis Miller, in the TV series King of the Hill; father of Bobby's classmate Randy
- George Stobbart, from the Broken Sword adventure games
- Harry Wykoff, in the six-hour mini-series Wild Palms
- Calvin's father, in comic strip Calvin and Hobbes; the father of Bill Watterson, the creator of this cartoon series, is a patent attorney

== See also ==
- List of people associated with patent law
