= Notre Dame High School (West Haven, Connecticut) =

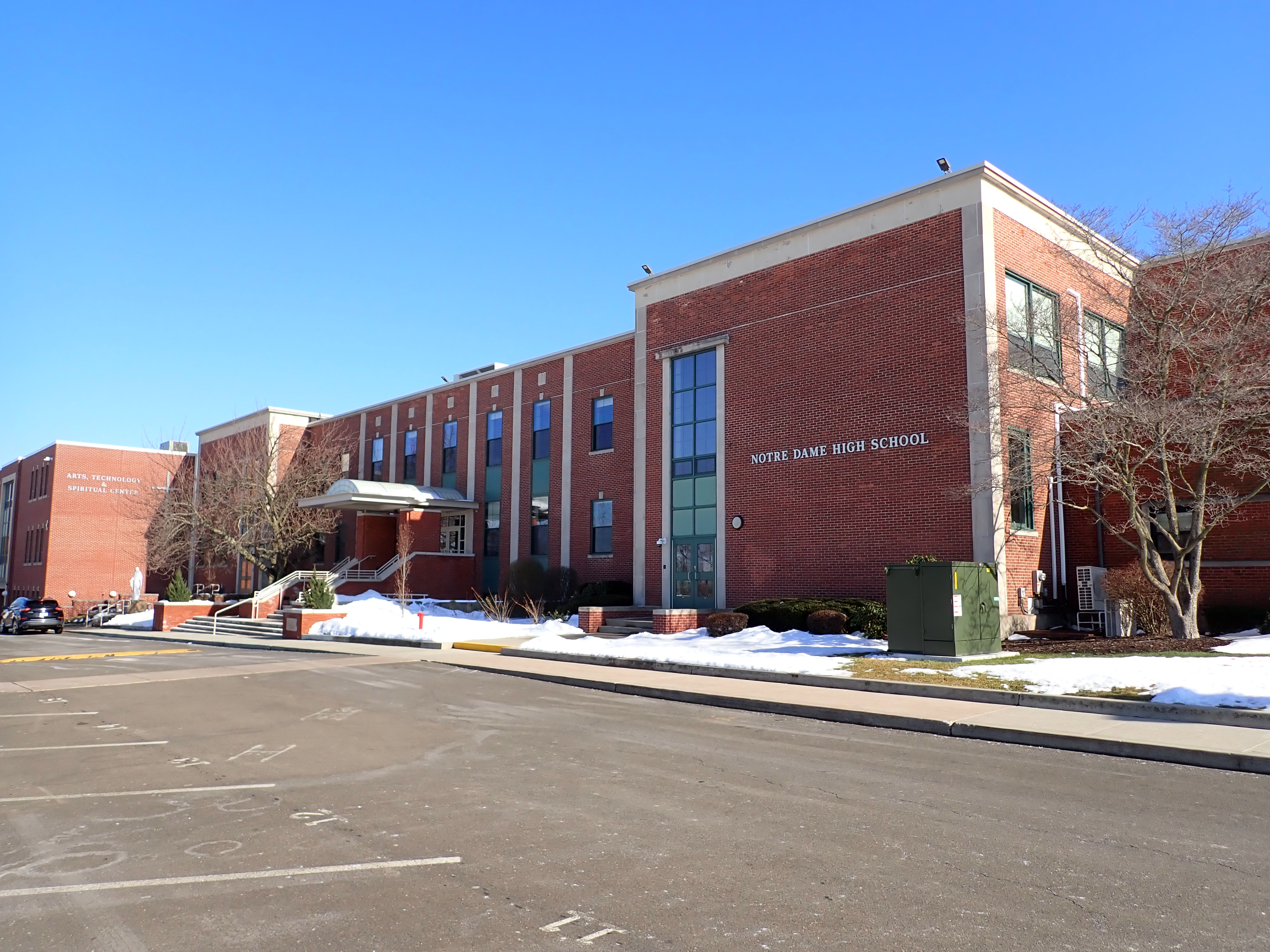

Location
- One Notre Dame Way; West Haven, Connecticut 06516; United States
- 41°17′16″N 72°57′39″W

Information
- Type: Private secondary school
- Motto: Educating Minds and Hearts in the Holy Cross Tradition
- Religious affiliation: Roman Catholic
- Established: 1946 (80 years ago)
- Founder: John Heller
- CEEB code: 070905
- President: Robert Curis
- Grades: 9–12
- Campus type: Suburban
- Colors: Green and gold
- Athletics conference: Southern Connecticut Conference
- Nickname: Green Knights
- Accreditation: New England Association of Schools and Colleges
- Publication: The Mind's Eye
- Yearbook: The Shield
- School fees: $800 activity and e-textbook fee
- Tuition: $18,690 (2023–2024 school year)
- Affiliation: Brothers of Holy Cross
- Website: www.notredamehs.com

Notre Dame High School (NDWH) is a private, Roman Catholic, co-educational college preparatory school located in West Haven, Connecticut, a coastal suburb of New Haven, Connecticut.

== History ==
Notre Dame High School was founded in 1946 by the Congregation of Holy Cross, the same religious institute that established the University of Notre Dame. The school's name derives from the French Notre Dame, meaning "Our Lady". Situated on a hill, the school originally comprised several buildings, one of which is Harugari Hall (now in the possession of the neighboring University of New Haven).

Announced in 2007, the new 28,000-square-foot Arts, Technology, and Spiritual Center was officially opened for the 2012–13 academic school year. On September 16, 2012, Reverend Henry J. Mansell, Archbishop of Hartford, presided over the blessing and dedication of this addition, which houses the Saint Brother André Bessette Chapel, the Maureen and George Collins ’58 Auditorium, an enhanced Music Room (which includes practice rooms and a technology room), a new Library and Media Center, and a Technology Classroom.

In 2014, Notre Dame High School began raising funds for the "Field of Dreams" project, which aimed to create new football practice fields and renovate the outdoor track.

== Shift to co-education ==
Notre Dame High School has been an all-boys school since 1946. On April 3, 2024, the school announced that it will shift to a co-education model and will begin enrolling girls in fall 2025. Notre Dame cited creating a "sustainable enrollment" as central to its decision to move to co-ed. According to the school, it is the 19th of 22 schools founded in the Holy Cross tradition to become co-educational.

== Administration and academics ==
Located in the Roman Catholic Archdiocese of Hartford, Notre Dame is operated independently by the Congregation of Holy Cross. The school is run day-to-day on a Headmaster-Principal model. Notre Dame draws a diverse student body from across the New Haven County area and beyond. Its sister school is Sacred Heart Academy, located in Hamden, Connecticut. The teaching faculty is composed predominantly of laypeople, though there are still a handful of Brothers. Both "extended study" and "semester at college" programs are available to qualified students during their senior year.

== Athletics ==
Known as the "Green Knights," Notre Dame High School's athletes boast a rich tradition of success with notable football, ice hockey, baseball, tennis, golf, basketball, swim, and track programs. The school also competes in wrestling, lacrosse, and most recently, crew. Notre Dame is a member of the Southern Connecticut Conference. Its gymnasium is decorated with several league and state championship banners and the names of All-State athletes.

== Notable alumni ==
- Tom Condon, Class of 1970 – former NFL football player
- Daniel Cosgrove, Class of 1989 – actor
- Matt DelGuidice, Class of 1985 – former NHL hockey player
- John DeStefano, Jr., Class of 1973 – former Mayor of New Haven, Connecticut
- Bob DuPuy, Class of 1964 – former President and Chief Operating Officer of Major League Baseball
- Sean Goldrich, Class of 2010 – Head Coach, Football, University of New Hampshire
- Alan Catello Grazioso, Class of 1987 - Emmy Award-winning television producer, director, and editor
- James J. Griffin, Class of 1967, author of traditional western and Texas Ranger novels
- David Laflamme, Class of 1987 – Head Coach, Men's Rugby, Brown University
- George S. Logan, Class of 1987 – Connecticut State Senator
- Martin Looney, Class of 1966 – President Pro Tempore of the Connecticut State Senate
- John Moffitt, Class of 2006 – former NFL football player
- Leigh Montville, Class of 1961 – journalist and columnist
- Wayne Pacelle, Class of 1983 – former president and CEO of The Humane Society of the United States
- John M. Picard, Class of 1983 – former Mayor of West Haven, Connecticut (2005–2013)
- Nick Pietrosante, Class of 1954 – former All-American for University of Notre Dame and NFL football player
- Tarek Saleh, Class of 1993 – former NFL football player
- Tremont Waters, Class of 2017 – former NBA basketball player
- Abdou Toure, basketball player, Class of 2026 – basketball player

== See also ==
- Congregation of Holy Cross
- List of high school football rivalries (less than 100 years old)
- Roman Catholic Archdiocese of Hartford
