= William Heffernan III =

American politician

Member of the Connecticut House of Representatives from the 115th district
- Incumbent
- Assumed office January 23, 2024
- Preceded by: Dorinda Keenan Borer

Personal details
- Born: October 31, 1963 (age 62)
- Party: Democratic
- Relations: Kevin Heffernan (cousin)
- Education: University of New Haven (AS)

William Heffernan III (born October 31, 1963) is an American politician. He is a Democratic member of the Connecticut House of Representatives serving in the 115th district since 2024.

== Background ==
William Heffernan III is a retired American firefighter who served 28 years with the West Haven Fire Department, reaching the rank of Lieutenant. He was among the first responders at Ground Zero in New York City following the September 11, 2001 attacks. In January 2023, he was appointed Department Historian. In addition to his fire service career, Heffernan was a consulting producer for the television series Tacoma FD.

== Connecticut House of Representatives ==
He won a special election on January 23, 2024, to fill the seat vacated by former Representative Dorinda Keenan Borer, who resigned after being elected mayor of West Haven. Heffernan was re-elected in the general election on November 5, 2024.
