= Richard Borer =

American politician and executive

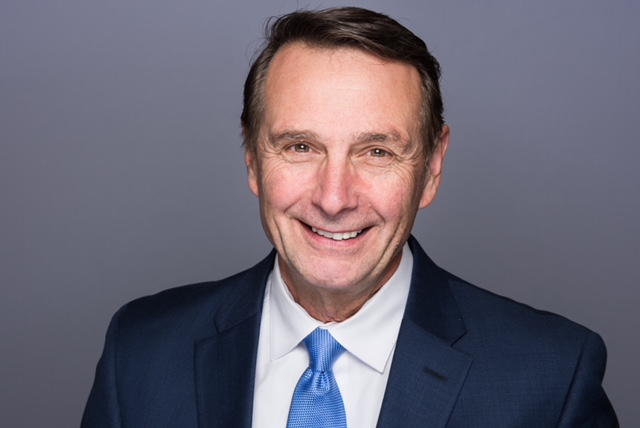
H. Richard Borer Jr. Richard Borer 2018

Mayor of West Haven, Connecticut
- In office 1991–2005

President and CEO, Goodwill Industries of Southern New England
- Incumbent
- Assumed office 2006

Personal details
- Born: H. Richard Borer Jr. West Haven, Connecticut, U.S.
- Education: University of New Haven (Executive MBA), Charter Oak State College (BS)
- Profession: Nonprofit executive, former mayor

H. Richard Borer Jr. is an American public servant and nonprofit executive who served as mayor of West Haven, Connecticut from 1991 to 2005. Since 2006, he has been the president and CEO of Goodwill Industries of Southern New England, a regional nonprofit headquartered in North Haven, Connecticut.

== Early life and education ==
Borer was born and raised in West Haven, Connecticut. He earned a Bachelor of Science degree from Charter Oak State College and an Executive MBA from the University of New Haven.

== Career ==
Borer served as the mayor of West Haven for 14 years, beginning in December 1991. Early in his tenure as mayor, Borer inherited a severe financial crisis in West Haven that led the State of Connecticut to take direct control over the city's budget. During his tenure, he led the city through a financial crisis, implemented payroll reductions, and helped launch major infrastructure projects including a new Metro-North train station and a new police headquarters.

In 2006, Borer became president and CEO of Goodwill Industries of Southern New England. The organization serves communities throughout Connecticut and Rhode Island, providing workforce development, training, and support services for people with disabilities and other barriers to employment. Under Borer’s leadership, the organization has 15 retail locations and served over 1,100 clients.

As of 2025, he currently serves on the Milford Development and Housing Commission, the National Easter Seals Leadership Circle, and the Goodwill Industries International Board of Directors. He has also served on the Board of Directors of Farnum House.

== Personal life ==
Borer resides in North Haven, Connecticut. He was previously married to Dorinda Keenan Borer, who also served as mayor of West Haven and as a state representative.
