= Doug the Pug =

American celebrity dog (born 2012)

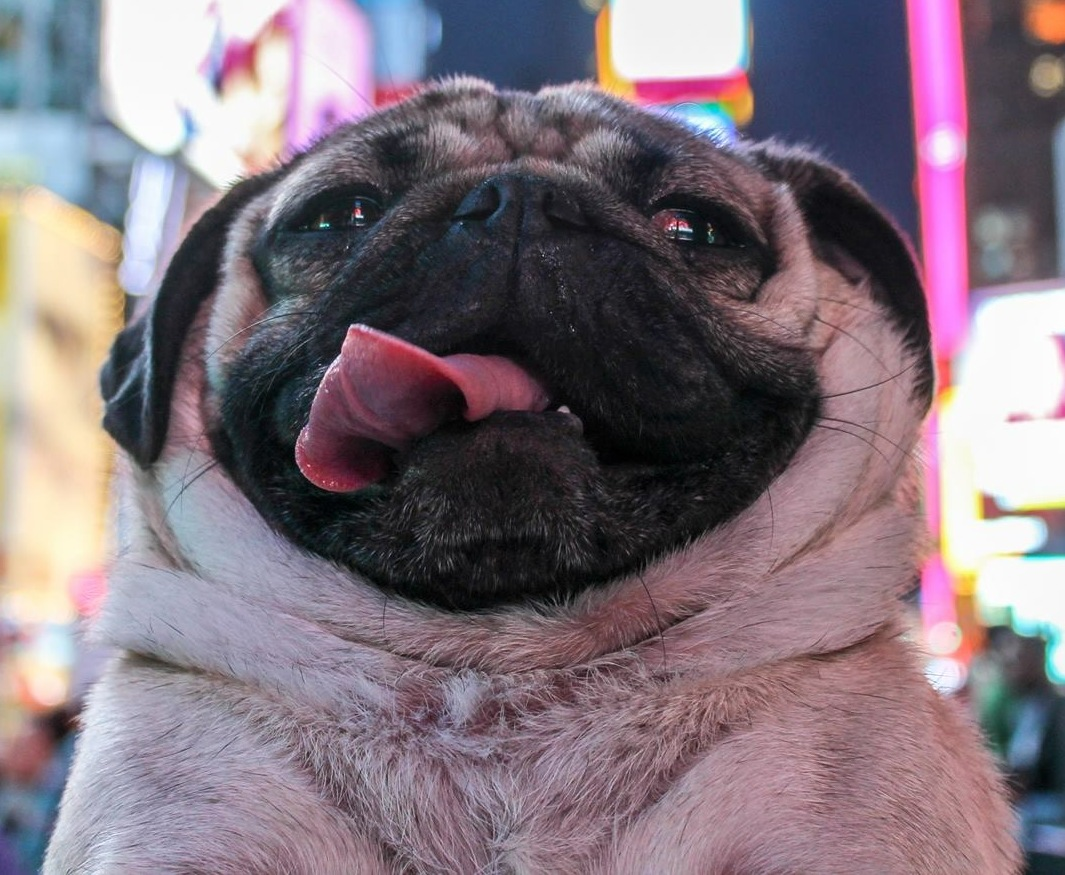
- Doug in 2015
- Breed: Pug
- Sex: Male
- Born: May 20, 2012 (age 14)
- Known for: Being an Internet celebrity
- Owner: Leslie Mosier

Doug the Pug (born May 20, 2012) is a celebrity pug living in Nashville, Tennessee, US who has gained a large internet and social media following.

Forbes named Doug the pug the second most influential pet in 2018, and he won two People's Choice Awards for Animal Star in 2019 and 2020. He is the most followed pug on the internet with over 18 million collective followers. Doug's Facebook page has over 6 million likes and 10 billion Facebook video views; his Instagram account has 3.9 million followers, and his Twitter account has over 2.6 million followers as of 2021.

== Career ==
Doug became famous on social media in 2014, when his owner Leslie Mosier created the Instagram account Doug the Pug. Mosier is the author of the New York Times best-seller Doug the Pug: The King of Pop Culture, released in November 2016. Following the release of his book, Mosier took Doug on an international book tour with stops in England, Paris, and the United States. To accompany her book, Mosier has released a line of calendars and a line of Doug the Pug apparel. Doug's first children's book was released with Scholastic in September 2019.

Doug has made appearances with various celebrities and also appears at music festivals, meet and greets, and movie premieres. Among these celebrities are Shakira, Ed Sheeran, Justin Bieber, Billie Eilish, John Legend, Cole Sprouse, Brendon Urie, PewDiePie and actors from the Netflix series Stranger Things.

Doug has a line of merchandise at the retailer Claire's, with a range of Gund stuffed animals, backpacks, and apparel. Doug also has a line of greeting cards with American Greetings, sold at Target and Wal-Mart, and a pair of shoes with Skechers.

Doug has featured in various news stories published by outlets such as Mashable, Cosmopolitan, BuzzFeed, TIME and The Huffington Post. Doug has appeared in national commercials for various products. In 2016, he appeared in Katy Perry's music video for "Swish Swish", and in 2017, he appeared in Fall Out Boy's music video for "Irresistible", and in DNCE's lyric video for "Kissing Strangers". In 2021, Doug voice acted for the role of Monchi in the Sony Pictures/Netflix animated feature The Mitchells vs. the Machines. In 2022, Doug the Pug Foundation, a charity that helps children fighting cancer, was started in his name.

== Awards and recognition ==
- In 2019, the mayor of Nashville, Tennessee, declared May 20 to be "Doug the Pug Day" in the city.
- Nashville Scene (2015) – Best of Nashville – "Best Instagram" Winner
- Webby Awards (2016) – "Social Media Animal" Nominee
- World Dog Awards (2016) – "Best Dressed" Winner
- Shorty Awards (2016) – "Social Media Animal" Nominee
- Shorty Awards (2017) – "Instagrammer of the Year" Winner
- Nickelodeon Kids' Choice Awards (2018) – "Favorite Instagram Pet" Nominee
- People's Choice Awards (2019) – "The Animal Star of 2019" Winner
- People's Choice Awards (2020) – "The Animal Star of 2020" Winner
- Honorary degree in "Furensic [sic] Science" from the University of New Haven (2025)

== See also ==
- List of individual dogs
