= Dorinda Keenan Borer =

American businesswoman and politician

14th Mayor of West Haven, Connecticut
- Incumbent
- Assumed office December 3, 2023
- Preceded by: Nancy Rossi

Member of the Connecticut House of Representatives from the 115th district
- In office February 2017 – December 2, 2023
- Preceded by: Stephen Dargan
- Succeeded by: Bill Heffernan

Personal details
- Born: West Haven, Connecticut, U.S.
- Party: Democratic
- Children: Drew
- Education: Southern Connecticut State University; University of New Haven

Dorinda Keenan Borer is an American businesswoman and politician who has served as mayor of West Haven, Connecticut since 2023. Borer is a former member of the West Haven Board of Education and served as a Democratic member of the Connecticut House of Representatives, representing District 115.

== Early life and education ==
Born and raised in West Haven, Borer received her B.S. in Business Administration and Management at Southern Connecticut State University and her M.B.A. from the University of New Haven.

== Career ==
Borer founded her own management and consulting business, PureFire Executive Consulting, after working as vice president for UnitedHealth Group#UnitedHealthcare. Prior to that, she was a personnel director for the Town of Stratford and the City of Bridgeport for ten years as well as branch administrator and bank operational auditor of Lafayette American Bank for seven.

Outside of her professional work, Borer was Bailey Middle School PTA president, served on the local Board of Education from 2009 to 2013, and founded the West Haven Early Childhood Development Commission. She was also on the board of directors of the Area Cooperative Educational Services Foundation and served two years as president of the Irish-American Club. Her community activism also included serving on the Greater New Haven St. Patrick's Day Parade Committee and founding the West Haven Italian Street Festival in 2003, for which she was chairwoman until 2011.

Her work in the town's thriving Irish community was honored in 2014 when she was named "Irishwoman of the Year" for the city's 23rd annual celebration of St. Patrick's Day Parade. Among those in attendance who praised her contributions were West Haven Mayor Edward O'Brien, U.S. Representative Rosa L. DeLauro and Senator Richard Blumenthal. Eleven years earlier, she was grand marshal of the event's parade. West Haven has also given Borer a Community Volunteerism award.

Since her election in 2017, Borer has chaired the General Assembly's Veterans' Affairs Committee, most notably passing legislation that gave tax relief to veterans. Borer also co-chairs the Women's Bipartisan Caucus. She has served as a member of the Environment Committee where she introduced legislation to eliminate and reduce the use of plastic and polystyrene, and also as a member of the Tobacco 21 Committee where she advocated for addiction resources and solutions to the vaping crisis. She's a former vice chair and current member of the Public Health committee where she spearheaded a bill to eliminate the costs of breast cancer screenings and children's oral health bills in Connecticut.

Borer resigned from the Connecticut House in December 2023 after being elected mayor of West Haven.

== Electoral history ==
In January 2017, after it was made known Rep. Dargan would be leaving his seat to take a job for a position with the state Board of Pardons and Paroles, Borer was selected by local Democrats as their nominee for the seat's upcoming special election.

Connecticut's 115th House District special election, 2017
Party	Candidate	Votes	%
Democratic	Dorinda Keenan Borer	1,973	64.4
Republican	Edward R. Granfield	1,093	35.6

== Personal life ==
Borer's ex-husband is H. Richard Borer Jr., former mayor of West Haven. They have one son, Drew, together.
