= Stephen Dargan =

American politician (1955–2026)

Member of the Connecticut House of Representatives from the 115th district
- In office January 9, 1991 – January 4, 2017
- Preceded by: Vito Mazza
- Succeeded by: Dorinda Keenan Borer

Personal details
- Born: March 29, 1955 West Haven, Connecticut, U.S.
- Died: April 22, 2026 (aged 71) West Haven, Connecticut, U.S.
- Party: Democratic

Stephen Dargan (March 29, 1955 – April 22, 2026) was an American politician who served in the Connecticut House of Representatives from the 115th district from 1991 to 2017.

He died of cancer on April 22, 2026, in West Haven, Connecticut at age 71.
