= Mary Jane Kelly (politician) =

American politician

Member of the Connecticut House of Representatives from the 115th district
- In office 1983–1985
- Preceded by: Alexander F. Zarnowski
- Succeeded by: Joseph D. Nardini

Personal details
- Party: Democratic

Mary Jane Kelly is an American politician who served in the Connecticut House of Representatives from 1983 to 1985, representing the 115th district as a Democrat. She lived in West Haven during her tenure.
