= James J. Griffin =

American novelist

- Born: 1949 (age 76–77)
- Education: Notre Dame High School; Southern Connecticut State University
- Occupation: Author
- Writing career
- Genre: Western fiction
- Website: jamesjgriffin.net/index.html

James J. Griffin (born 1949) is an American author of traditional western and Texas Ranger novels. Some of his series include the Jim Blawcyzk Texas Ranger stories, Cody Havlicek novels, the A Ranger Named Rowdy series. and the Lone Star Ranger series of Young Adult western novels. He is also a contributor to the Western Fictioneers' collaborative series, Wolf Creek. He is an enthusiast and former collector of Texas Rangers historical artefacts, and has contributed much material to the Waco Texas Ranger Hall of Fame and Museum.

Griffin was educated at Notre Dame High School in West Haven, Connecticut, from where he progressed to the nearby Southern Connecticut State University.
