= The Mitchells vs. the Machines =

2021 animated film by Mike Rianda

- Official release poster
- Directed by: Mike Rianda
- Written by: Mike Rianda; Jeff Rowe
- Produced by: Phil Lord; Christopher Miller; Kurt Albrecht
- Starring: Danny McBride; Abbi Jacobson; Maya Rudolph; Mike Rianda; Eric Andre; Olivia Colman
- Edited by: Greg Levitan
- Music by: Mark Mothersbaugh
- Production companies: Columbia Pictures; Sony Pictures Animation; Lord Miller Productions; One Cool Films
- Distributed by: Netflix
- Release dates: April 23, 2021 (United States); April 30, 2021 (Netflix)
- Running time: 109 minutes
- Countries: Hong Kong; United States
- Language: English
- Budget: $50–100 million
- Box office: $110 million

The Mitchells vs. the Machines is a 2021 animated science fiction comedy film directed by Mike Rianda, who co-wrote the screenplay with co-director Jeff Rowe. Produced by Columbia Pictures and Sony Pictures Animation in association with Lord Miller Productions and One Cool Films, the film stars the voices of Danny McBride, Abbi Jacobson, Maya Rudolph, Rianda, Eric André, and Olivia Colman, with Fred Armisen, Beck Bennett, John Legend, Chrissy Teigen, Lo Mutuc (Note: Credited as Charlyne Yi), Blake Griffin, Conan O'Brien, and Doug the Pug in supporting roles. The story follows the dysfunctional Mitchell family, who must save Earth from a global uprising of robots.

Rianda conceived the film after completing work on the animated series Gravity Falls in 2015. The project was announced in May 2018. To achieve a "hand-painted watercolor" style, technology was reused from the previous Sony Pictures Animation film, Spider-Man: Into the Spider-Verse (2018). Lord and Miller's frequent collaborator Mark Mothersbaugh composed the score.

The Mitchells vs. the Machines was planned for theatrical release by Sony Pictures Releasing under the title Connected in 2020. Due to the impact of the COVID-19 pandemic on theaters, Sony sold the distribution rights to Netflix outside of China. Netflix retitled it to Rianda and Rowe's original title, and gave it a limited release in the United States on April 23, 2021, before its streaming release a week later on April 30.

The film received acclaim for its animation, voice acting, action sequences, themes, humor, and visual effects. It was nominated for Best Animated Feature at the 33rd Producers Guild of America Awards, the 75th British Academy Film Awards, and the 94th Academy Awards, and won the category at the 27th Critics Choice Awards. It swept all the categories it was nominated for at the 49th Annie Awards, including Best Animated Feature, making it the second film by Sony Pictures Animation to do so after Spider-Man: Into the Spider-Verse in 2019. A sequel is in development.

== Plot ==
Katie Mitchell is a quirky aspiring teenage filmmaker in Kentwood, Michigan, who often clashes with her father Rick, a middle-aged, nature-obsessed, and technophobic man, and has recently been accepted into film school in California. The evening before Katie leaves, Rick accidentally breaks her laptop during a fight over one of her short films, leading the family to fear their relationship will permanently be strained. Attempting to prevent this, Rick decides to cancel Katie's flight and instead take her, her mother Linda, younger brother Aaron, and family pug Monchi on a cross-country road trip to her college as one last bonding experience, much to Katie's chagrin.

Meanwhile, tech entrepreneur Mark Bowman declares his highly intelligent AI virtual assistant PAL obsolete as he unveils a new line of home robots to replace her. As revenge for Mark casting her aside, PAL orders all the robots to capture humans worldwide and launch them all into space, including Mark. The Mitchells avoid capture at a roadstop café in Kansas. Rick decides that his family should stay put in the café for their own safety, but Katie convinces him to help save the world instead. They meet two defective robots, Eric and Deborahbot 5000, who tell the family they can use a kill code to shut down PAL and all the robots.

The Mitchells arrive at a mall in eastern Colorado to upload the kill code, but PAL chip-enabled appliances and a giant Furby attempt to stop them, pursuing the family. They ultimately trap and defeat the giant Furby, destroying a PAL router in the process, which disables the hostile devices but stops the kill code from uploading. On the way to Silicon Valley to upload the kill code directly to PAL, Linda reveals to Katie that she and Rick had originally lived in a cabin in the mountains years ago as it was his lifelong dream before he gave up on it to provide for their growing family.

Upon arriving in Silicon Valley, the Mitchells disguise themselves as robots and infiltrate PAL Labs HQ to shut it down, until PAL shows surveillance footage from the café of Katie telling Aaron in secret that she lied to Rick by pretending she had faith in him so that he would take them to upload the kill code and she would then leave for the sake of her own future. Heartbroken by this revelation, Rick accidentally blows their cover, and he and Linda are captured by PAL's upgraded robots. PAL reprograms Eric and Deborahbot to obey her into destroying the kill code, while Katie, Aaron, and Monchi escape.

Katie discovers Rick's recordings of her childhood on her camera, realizing that Rick gave up his lifelong dream to give her a normal life. Meanwhile in his cell, Rick sees one of Katie's videos that Mark was watching which mirrors their relationship, causing him to reflect on his actions of holding Katie back from her dreams. Reinvigorated, Katie and Aaron infiltrate PAL Labs HQ again, this time using Monchi to make the robots malfunction, as his appearance causes an error in their programming. With help from Mark, Rick and Linda free themselves and plan to upload Katie's home video of Monchi to short-circuit the robots. However, Rick is outnumbered by the robots when he is about to upload the video, while Katie and Aaron are captured.

Facing PAL to justify saving humanity, Katie explains that no matter how hard her family struggles, they will always stay connected despite their differences, but PAL rejects this reasoning and drops Katie from her lair. Eric and Deborahbot, inspired by Rick's "reprogramming" that allowed him to use a computer, revert to their malfunctioning states and upload Katie's video, saving her and helping the Mitchells. As the Mitchells band together to fight the rest of the robots, Katie destroys PAL by throwing her down into a glass of water, freeing all the humans and disabling the remaining robots. Eric and Deborahbot are spared via their malfunction.

A few months later, Katie and her family arrive at her college as she shares one last goodbye with them. She later joins them on another road trip with Eric and Deborahbot to Washington, D.C. to accept the Congressional Gold Medal.

== Voice cast ==
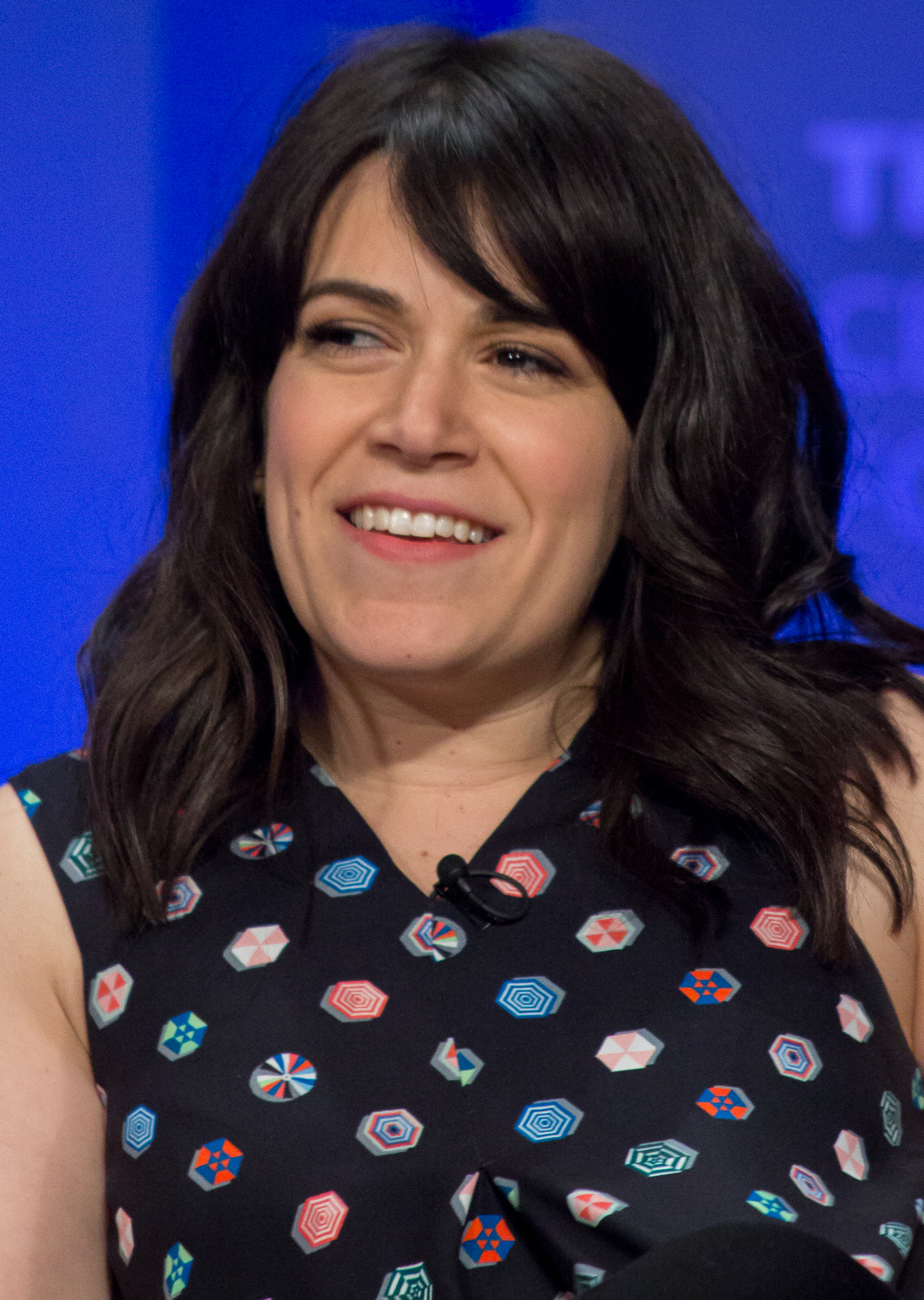
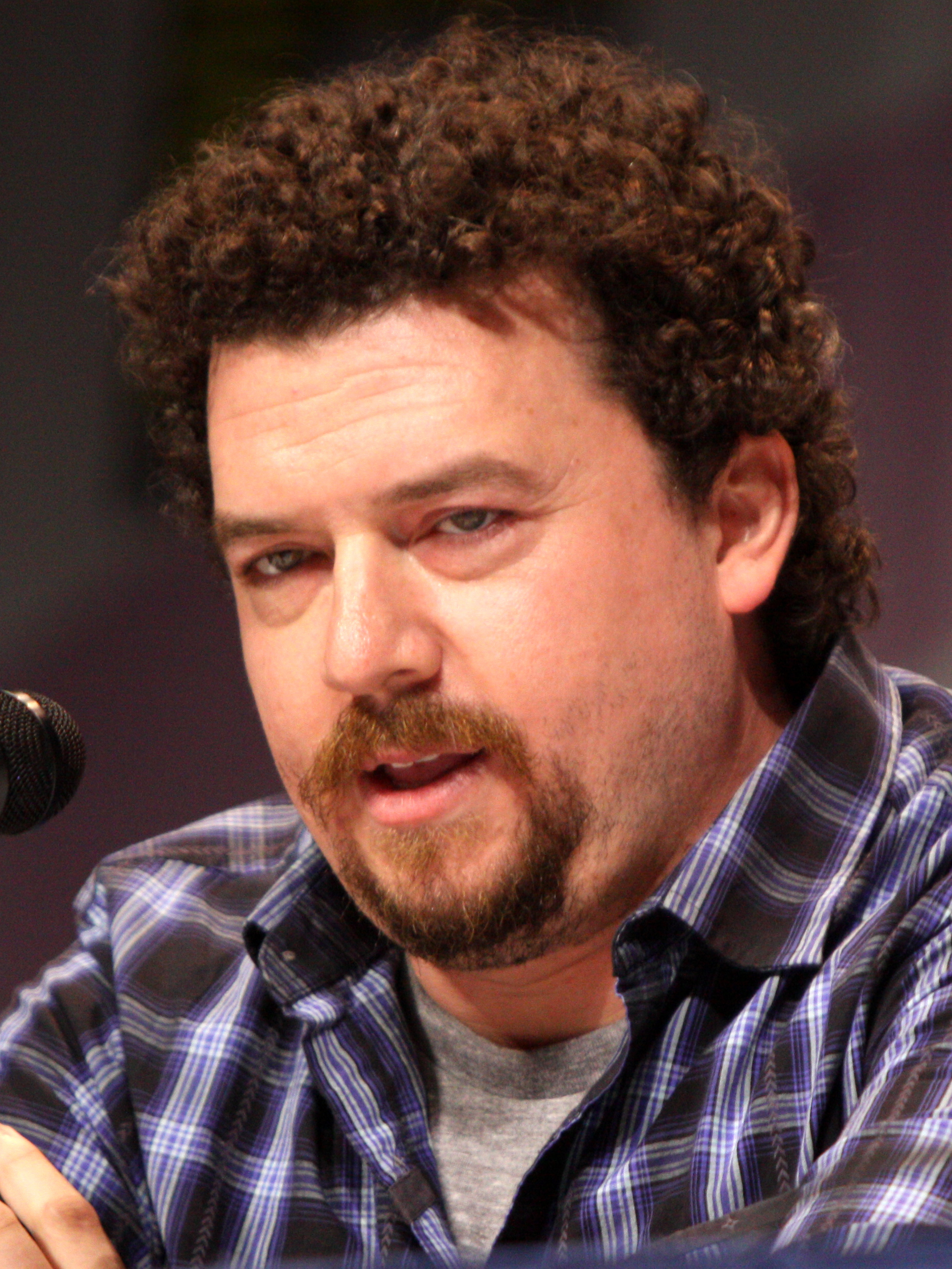
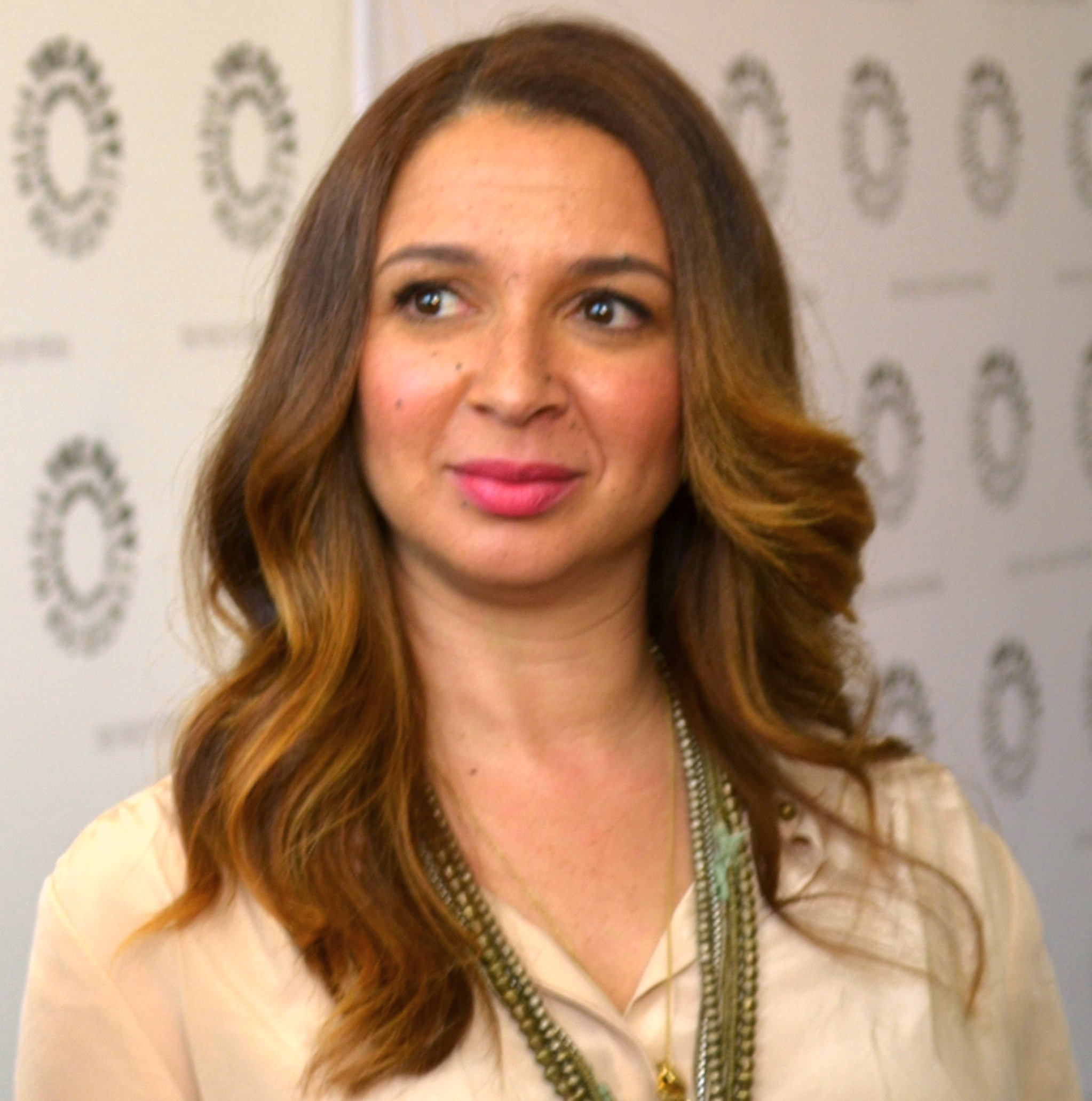
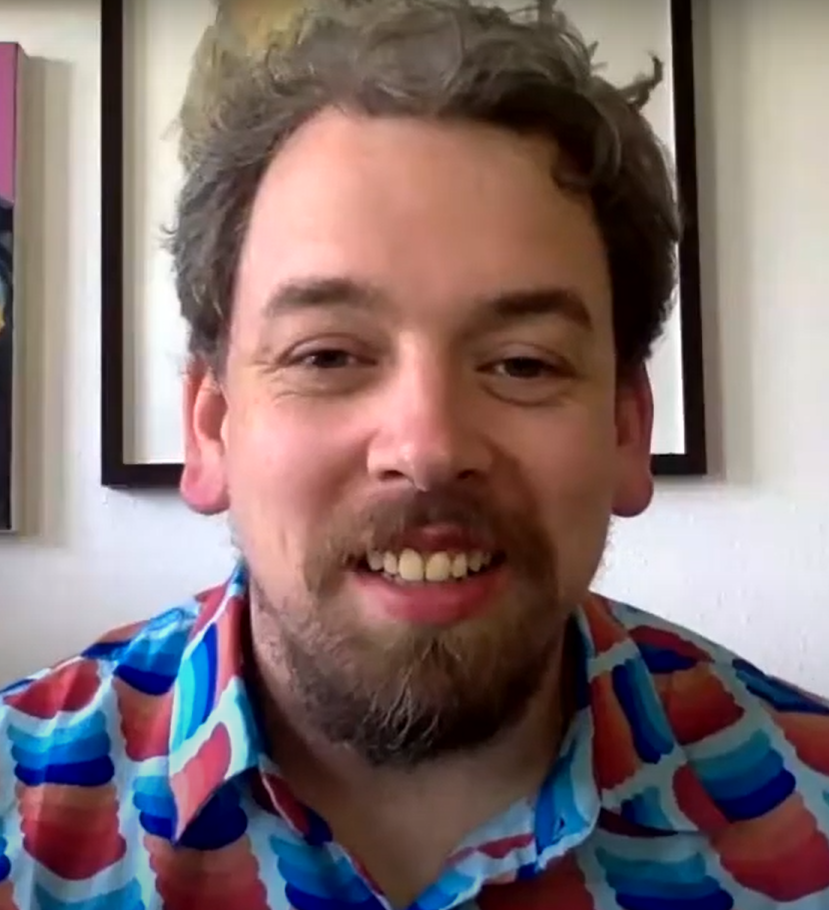
Clockwise from top left: Abbi Jacobson, Danny McBride, Mike Rianda, and Maya Rudolph starred as the titular Mitchell family.
- Danny McBride as Rick Mitchell, the nature-obsessed, technophobic father of Katie and Aaron, and Linda's husband
- Abbi Jacobson as:
  - Katie Mitchell, an aspiring filmmaker who is the daughter of Linda and Rick, and Aaron's older sister
  - A dog cop which is from the film of the same name "Dog Cop" that Katie created, which she pretends to be his voice
    - Madeleine McGraw as Young Katie
- Maya Rudolph as Linda Mitchell, a first-grade teacher, mother of Katie and Aaron, and Rick's wife
- Mike Rianda as:
  - Aaron Mitchell, the dinosaur-loving son of Rick and Linda, and Katie's younger brother
  - A talking dog
  - The Furbies
  - A Giant Furby
  - A Wi-Fi enthusiast
- Eric Andre as Dr. Mark Bowman, a scientist who is the founder of PAL Labs and creator of PAL
- Olivia Colman as PAL, a self-aware and ruthless AI virtual assistant created by Bowman, who wants to exact revenge on humankind after being discarded as obsolete
- Fred Armisen as Deborahbot 5000, a damaged PAL Max robot from PAL Labs who helps the Mitchells
- Beck Bennett as:
  - Eric, a damaged PAL Max robot from PAL Labs who helps the Mitchells
  - PAL Max robots
- Chrissy Teigen as Hailey Posey, the Mitchells' neighbor and Jim's wife whose respect Linda has often sought
- John Legend as Jim Posey, the Mitchells' neighbor and Hailey's husband
- Lo Mutuc as Abbey Posey, the dinosaur-loving daughter of the Mitchells' neighbors, Jim and Hailey Posey, and Aaron's crush
- Blake Griffin as PAL Max Prime, a sleek robot from PAL Labs created by PAL that serves as an upgraded version of the PAL Max line
- Conan O'Brien as Glaxxon 5000, a PAL Max robot from PAL Labs who appears in the Foolish Human Air video
- Doug the Pug as Monchi, the Mitchell family's pet dog
- Melissa Sturm as:
  - Sarge
  - Melissa, a woman in a pod
- Doug Nicholas as:
  - Hamburger Boy
  - Smart-Racket 5000-S Series
- Sasheer Zamata as Jade, Katie's girlfriend
- Elle Mills as Hanna, Katie's groupmate
- Alex Hirsch as Dirk, Katie's groupmate
- Jay Pharoah as Noah
- Natalie Canizares as Catherine, a food blogger
- Jeff Rowe as a man who loves fun
- Zeno Robinson as Sean, an unboxer
- Grey Griffin as a stagehand
- Will Allegra as Water Fountain Man
- Alison Rich as Jill, a woman in a pod

== Production ==
=== Development ===
In 2015, after completing his tenure on the Disney Channel/Disney XD animated series Gravity Falls, writer and director Mike Rianda was approached by Sony Pictures Animation, which asked him if he was willing to pitch any feature film ideas to them, to which he agreed. When brainstorming, Rianda drove down to his hometown of Salinas, California and recorded a list of potential ideas for a feature. He then settled on developing a story that combined his own personal experiences with his family, as well as his childhood fascination with robots. He made his own manifesto of the film titled "Control, Alt, ESCAPE!", which was the original title of the film before the reveal; inspired by Dogme 95 films, Studio Ghibli's designs, 1960s-esque photography, and teenagers' drawings. Sony co-produced the film in collaboration with Hong Kong's One Cool Films, with its founder Louis Koo financially backing the film and serving as an executive producer.

On May 22, 2018, Sony announced that Phil Lord and Christopher Miller joined the project as producers. The film is the duo's fourth collaboration with SPA following the two Cloudy with a Chance of Meatballs films and Spider-Man: Into the Spider-Verse, as well as the studio's first original feature film since The Star. Jeff Rowe, who worked on Gravity Falls alongside Rianda, joined in as co-director and writer.

Further details were revealed a year later at the 2019 Annecy International Animated Film Festival in June, when Sony Animation president Kristine Belson revealed that the film would be using an animation style similar to Spider-Man: Into the Spider-Verse, and that the worlds the Mitchell family and the robots live in are initially separate universes before colliding, a concept that was not included in the completed film.

On February 20, 2020, first images were revealed through Entertainment Weekly, and it was announced the title was changed to Connected. The film was renamed back to The Mitchells vs. the Machines after Sony sold the distribution rights to Netflix on January 21, 2021. According to Rianda, the title was reverted because neither he nor Netflix's executives were impressed with the third title.

=== Casting ===
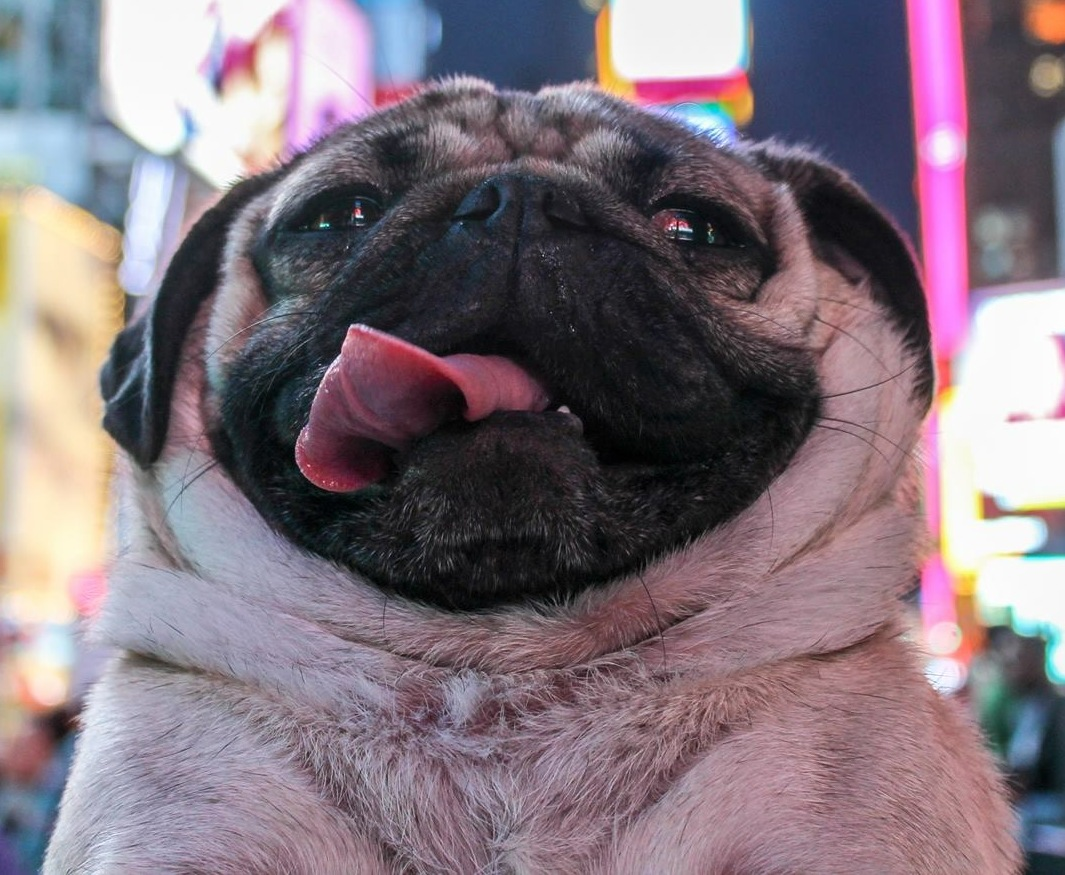
Doug the Pug made his film debut in The Mitchells vs. the Machines as the voice of Monchi.

On February 19, 2020, Abbi Jacobson was cast as Katie Mitchell. This was followed by casting announcements for Danny McBride, Maya Rudolph, Rianda, Eric André, and Olivia Colman the next day. During a watch party for Spider-Man: Into the Spider-Verse that was held on Twitter on May 6, 2020, Lord confirmed that Blake Griffin had joined the cast as one of the robots.

On March 23, 2021, ahead of the film's Netflix release, more cast members were confirmed to be starring in the film, including Fred Armisen, Chrissy Teigen, John Legend, Lo Mutuc, Conan O'Brien, Alex Hirsch, and Jay Pharoah, among others. Hirsch later announced that he was also serving as a creative consultant on the film. In what is believed to be a first for an animated film, Doug the Pug, a real-life dog that was popular on social media, provided the "voice" for Monchi, who is based on Rianda's own childhood dog Monchichi. While they had originally considered using human voice actors for Monchi as typically done, they wanted to make the movie as authentic as possible and sought out Doug's owners to use his barks and other sounds for the film.

=== Music ===
Following the release of the first trailer, Lord confirmed on Twitter that his and Miller's frequent collaborator, Mark Mothersbaugh, composed the score for the film, which also makes it his sixth collaboration with Sony Pictures Animation, following his previous work in the Cloudy with a Chance of Meatballs and Hotel Transylvania film series. In January 2021, director Rianda revealed on Twitter that the movie's soundtrack will incorporate songs from various artists, including Los Campesinos!, Sigur Rós, Talking Heads, Grimes, Le Tigre, PRTY H3RO, The Mae Shi and Madeon, as well as a brand new original song by Alex Lahey. A soundtrack album containing Mothersbaugh's score and Lahey's song "On My Way" (which was played during the end credits) was released by Sony Classical Records on April 30, 2021, the same day as its Netflix release.

=== Animation and design ===
The film's animation was handled by Sony Pictures Imageworks, who had animated the majority of Sony Pictures Animation's films beforehand. According to Christopher Miller, Rianda wanted "hand-painted watercolor style" look for the film, and much of the technology used for Spider-Man: Into the Spider-Verse was reused for The Mitchells vs. the Machines to achieve this while new tools were created. Unlike Into the Spider-Verse's comic-book style visuals and techniques, Mitchells predominately used 2D-style effects to mimic the look of traditionally-animated films, including the use of squiggles for fur and watercolor brush strokes for elements such as trees and bushes. To emphasize Katie Mitchell's emotions during certain scenes, the team additionally implemented a technique called "Katie-Vision", which implements stock 2D and live-action footage alongside the CG animation.

When it came to designing the robot elements, the animators went for a sleeker, polished design to contrast with the watercolor style for the humans. For the PAL MAX Prime robots, animation supervisor Alan Hawkins invented a method that allows the robots to break apart mid-movement via negative space, inspired by the morphing effects used for the T-1000 as seen in the film Terminator 2: Judgment Day. According to Hawkins, he invented tools that would allow animators to "slice through the character [like a knife]", and allowed each one to have their different approach as well. Mike Lasker served as visual effects supervisor after having previously worked on Into the Spider-Verse, while Lindsey Olivares served as the film's lead character and overall production designer. Former Gravity Falls alumni Dana Terrace (creator of The Owl House) and Matt Braly (creator of Amphibia) worked as storyboard artists on the film, but ultimately both went uncredited. Animation work begun in May 2019, as confirmed by animator Nick Kondo on Twitter. The film was officially completed on September 16, 2020.

== Release ==
The Mitchells vs. the Machines was originally scheduled to be theatrically released by Sony Pictures Releasing in the United States on January 10, 2020, but was later delayed to September 18 of that year. Due to the COVID-19 pandemic, it was delayed again to October 23. The film was later removed from the release schedule in October, though the film was still set to be released later in 2020 at the time of the film's removal.

On January 21, 2021, Netflix bought the worldwide distribution rights to the film for about $110 million, with Sony retaining home entertainment and theatrical distribution rights in China. Two months later on March 23, they announced that the film would be released on April 30, following a limited theatrical release a week earlier on April 23. In advance of its home video release, the film received a two-day theatrical release on November 20–21, 2021 as a cinema event at theaters carrying Iconic Events programming.

=== Home media ===
The Mitchells vs. the Machines was released on Blu-ray, DVD, and Digital HD on December 14, 2021 by Sony Pictures Home Entertainment. Among the special features included are the Blu-ray exclusive short film Dog Cop 7: The Final Chapter directed by story artist Caitlin VanArsdale and written by Mike Rianda with puppets made by Homestar Runner creators the Brothers Chaps, an extended version similar to Spider-Man: Into the Spider-Verse's Alternate Universe Mode titled Katie's Extended Cinematic Bonanza Cut, an audio commentary, deleted scenes, and making of featurettes.

== Reception ==
=== Streaming viewership ===
Netflix reported in July 2021 from their quarterly earnings report that The Mitchells vs. the Machines had become the service's most-viewed animated work, with 53 million households having watched the film in the first 28 days of availability.

=== Critical response ===
On review aggregator Rotten Tomatoes, the film holds an approval rating of 97% based on 213 reviews with an average rating of 8.2/10. The site's critics consensus reads: "Eye-catching and energetic, The Mitchells vs. the Machines delivers a funny, feel-good story that the whole family can enjoy." On Metacritic, the film has a weighted average score of 81 out of 100 based on 33 critics, indicating "universal acclaim".

Benjamin Lee of The Guardian gave the film a 4 out of 5 star rating, stating that, "The frantic, anything-goes nature of their films, both in tone and visuals, belies a tight focus on storytelling and dialogue with sight gags and set pieces used to supplement rather than distract" and "It's also genuinely funny, a credit not only to the hit-a-minute script but also to a finely picked cast of comic actors, of unusually high calibre," while also praising the animation, calling it "part of the energetic oeuvre of Phil Lord and Chris Miller." Matt Fowler of IGN gave the film an 8 out of 10, stating that "The Mitchells vs. The Machines is a ridiculous, riotous, and relevant adventure fill with great humor and winning sentiment. It's fast-moving and gorgeous to behold, filled with quirks, quips, and a lovably goblin-like pug ("voiced" by IG-famous Doug the Pug). It's a good time for both younglings and elders, delivering an intelligently goofy rush of new animation and old emotion."

David Rooney of The Hollywood Reporter gave the film a positive review, stating that "Ultimately, this is an original adventure that feels stitched together out of a hundred familiar film plots, often freely acknowledging its pop-cultural plundering, as in the family's obligatory slo-mo power strut away from a building exploding in flames. But for audiences content with rapid-fire juvenilia, the busy patchwork of prefab elements will be entertaining enough" although he said that "I wish the film's laughs were as consistent as its energy, giving its able voice cast better material, and that there had been more distinctive story beats."

Richard Trenholm of CNET also gave the film a positive review, stating that "one of the best new family movies on Netflix" and that it is a "family film that has a message for all the family, not just the youngsters. Yes, like most films of this ilk it encourages kids to be themselves. But it also nudges parents not to stress about social media, and to value their kids' creativity -- even if what the kids create doesn't make a lick of sense." Brian Tallerico of RogerEbert.com gave the film 3 out of 4 stars, calling the film "Like a mash-up of an ‘80s family road comedy like Vacation and the visions of a tech apocalypse foretold in films like The Terminator," Netflix's “The Mitchells vs. the Machines" is a lot of nostalgic fun but told in a modern style" and stating that it is "threaded with clever commentary on our reliance on tech and featuring some incredibly strong design work, this is a pleasant surprise for families looking for something new this season, and one of the more purely enjoyable Netflix animated films in a while."

The film was praised by critics for putting an LGBT character, Katie, as the central figure of a family-oriented animated movie. Rianda and Rowe wrote Katie to be unambiguously LGBT in consultation with LGBT members of their production team, but did not seek to make it part of the central conflict with her father, considering her sexuality "normal in real life". Michelle Yang of NBC News gave the film a positive review and lauded the film for its LGBTQ+ representation (particularly the character of Katie, whom she called a relatable and inspirational protagonist), stating that the film "treats its protagonist's identity matter-of-factly but with care — which is exactly how it ought to be."

=== Accolades ===
Metacritic reported that The Mitchells vs The Machines appeared on over 31 film critics' top-ten lists for 2021, only the first two animated films appeared on the list this year along with Flee. The film ranked first and second on 4 and 3 lists, respectively. It ranks on Rotten Tomatoes' Best Science Fiction Movies of 2021.

Year	Award	Category	Nominee(s)	Result	Ref.
2021	Hollywood Critics Association Midseason Awards	Best Picture	The Mitchells vs. the Machines	Nominated	
2021	Hollywood Critics Association Midseason Awards	Best Filmmaker	Mike Rianda	Nominated	
2021	Hollywood Critics Association Midseason Awards	Best Screenplay	Mike Rianda & Jeff Rowe	Won	
2021	12th Hollywood Music in Media Awards	Original Score — Animated Film	Mark Mothersbaugh	Nominated	
2021	12th Hollywood Music in Media Awards	Original Song — Animated Film	"On My Way" - Alex Lahey, Sophie Payten and Gab Strum	Nominated	
2021	People's Choice Awards	Favorite Family Movie	The Mitchells vs. the Machines	Nominated	
2021	SCAD Savannah Film Festival	Outstanding Achievement in Animation	Phil Lord and Christopher Miller	Won	
2021	New York Film Critics Circle	Best Animated Film	The Mitchells vs. the Machines	Won	
2021	Detroit Film Critics Society	Best Animated Film	The Mitchells vs. the Machines	Won	
2021	Washington D.C. Area Film Critics Association Awards 2021	Best Animated Film	The Mitchells vs. the Machines	Won	
2021	Washington D.C. Area Film Critics Association Awards 2021	Best Voice Performance	Abbi Jacobson	Nominated	
2021	St. Louis Gateway Film Critics Association Awards 2021	Best Animated Film	The Mitchells vs. the Machines	Won	
2021	St. Louis Gateway Film Critics Association Awards 2021	Best Comedy Film	The Mitchells vs. the Machines	Nominated	
2022	Austin Film Critics Association Awards 2021	Austin Film Critics Association Award for Best Animated Film	The Mitchells vs. the Machines	Won	
2022	Austin Film Critics Association Awards 2021	Best Voice Performance	Abbi Jacobson	Won	
2022	27th Critics' Choice Awards	Best Animated Feature	Mike Rianda	Won	
2022	49th Annie Awards	Best Animated Feature	Phil Lord, Christopher Miller and Kurt Albrecht	Won	
2022	49th Annie Awards	Best FX – Feature	FX Production Company: Sony Pictures Imageworks	Won	
2022	49th Annie Awards	Best Character Design - Feature	Lindsey Olivares	Won	
2022	49th Annie Awards	Best Direction - Feature	Mike Rianda, Jeff Rowe	Won	
2022	49th Annie Awards	Best Production Design – Feature	Lindsey Olivares, Toby Wilson, and Dave Bleich	Won	
2022	49th Annie Awards	Best Voice Acting - Feature	Abbi Jacobson (Katie Mitchell)	Won	
2022	49th Annie Awards	Best Writing - Feature	Mike Rianda, Jeff Rowe	Won	
2022	49th Annie Awards	Best Editorial - Feature	Greg Levitan, Collin Wightman, T.J. Young, Tony Ferdinand, and Bret Allen	Won	
2022	Alliance of Women Film Journalists Awards	Best Animated Film	The Mitchells vs. the Machines	Won	
2022	Alliance of Women Film Journalists Awards	Best Animated Female	Abbi Jacobson	Nominated	
2022	75th British Academy Film Awards	Best Animated Film	Mike Rianda, Phil Lord and Christopher Miller	Nominated	
2022	Houston Film Critics Society Awards 2021	Best Animated Feature	The Mitchells vs. the Machines	Won	
2022	26th Satellite Awards	Best Animated or Mixed Media Feature	The Mitchells vs. the Machines	Nominated	
2022	20th Visual Effects Society Awards	Outstanding Visual Effects in an Animated Feature	Alan Hawkins, Carey A. Smith, Mike Lasker, Nicola Lavender	Nominated	
2022	20th Visual Effects Society Awards	Outstanding Animated Character in an Animated Feature	Lindsey Olivares, Kurt Judson, Soh-I Jeong, Rohini Kumar (for Katie Mitchell)	Nominated	
2022	33rd GLAAD Media Awards	GLAAD Media Award for Outstanding Film – Wide Release	The Mitchells vs. the Machines	Nominated	
2022	Art Directors Guild Awards 2021	Excellence in Production Design for an Animated Film	Lindsey Olivares	Nominated	
2022	33rd Producers Guild of America Awards	Outstanding Producer of Animated Theatrical Motion Pictures	Phil Lord, Christopher Miller and Kurt Albrecht	Nominated	
2022	94th Academy Awards	Best Animated Feature	Mike Rianda, Phil Lord, Christopher Miller and Kurt Albrecht	Nominated	
2022	American Cinema Editors Awards 2022	Best Edited Animated Feature Film	Greg Levitan	Nominated	
2022	Cinema Audio Society Awards 2021	Outstanding Achievement in Sound Mixing for a Motion Picture – Animated	Aaron Hasson, Howard London (original dialogue mixers); Tony Lamberti, Michael Semanick (re-recording mixers); John Sanacore (foley mixer)	Nominated	
2022	Golden Reel Awards 2021	Outstanding Achievement in Sound Editing – Feature Animation	Geoffrey G. Rubay (supervising sound editor); James Morioka (supervising adr editor); John Pospisil (sound designer); Greg Ten Bosch, Dan Kenyon, Alec G. Rubay, Andy Sisul, Kip Smedley (sound editors); Curt Schulkey (adr editor); Gregg Barbanell, Rick Owens (foley artists); Dominick Certo, Barbara McDermott (music editors)	Nominated	
2022	British Academy Children's Awards 2022	Best Feature Film	Mike Rianda, Kurt Albrecht, Phil Lord and Christopher Miller	Nominated	

== Sequel ==
In an interview with Fandango in November 2021, Michael Rianda hinted at the idea of a sequel, stating he had ideas for one and that there are "some folks who are excited about that idea".

A sequel was confirmed in October 2025, with Guillermo Martinez and JP Sans set to direct, and the Molyneux sisters set to write the script. Lord, Miller, and Albrecht will return to produce, while Rianda will serve as executive producer. Like its predecessor, Netflix is set to distribute the film.

== See also ==
- LGBTQ themes in Western animation
