= WNHU =

- West Haven, Connecticut; United States
- Broadcast area: New Haven, Connecticut
- Frequency: 88.7 MHz
- Branding: Playing the Music we Love

Programming
- Format: Variety

Ownership
- Owner: University of New Haven

History
- First air date: June 4, 1973

Technical information
- Licensing authority: FCC
- Facility ID: 69070
- Class: A
- ERP: 1,700 watts
- HAAT: 49.0 meters
- Transmitter coordinates: 41°17′29″N 72°57′40″W

Links
- Public license information: Public file; LMS
- Website: www.wnhu.org

WNHU (88.7 FM) is a radio station broadcasting a variety format. Licensed to West Haven, Connecticut, United States, the station serves the New Haven area. The station is owned by the University of New Haven. The WNHU studios moved to its current home on Ruden Street into the Lois Evalyn Bergami Broadcast Media Center in the year 2015. Its location on Ruden Street includes a production space for live and recorded programming, a server room, staff offices and a student lounge. WNHU is currently managed by a 7- person student leadership team. Positions include Station Manager, WebMaster, Social Media Director, Business Manager, Operations Manager, Program Director and Director of Arts Community & Welfare.

The University of New Haven's Communications department started to work with the radio station for students to have access to the station. The Station operates as a lab for student learning, and as a source of culturally diverse programming for the communities we serve. In January 2016, Bruce Barber was hired as general manager of the station.

WNHU is broadcast on 88.7 FM. WNHU is considered the best college radio station in the state of Connecticut according to the New Haven Advocate, which has awarded the station "Best College Radio Station" for over 6 consecutive years. The station was founded as a student club in 1970, and features an eclectic mix of music and conversation from over 100 volunteer student and alumni deejays. Unlike many college or community radio stations where DJs change frequently, some WNHU personalities have hosted shows for years, of whom are UNH students and alumni.

On June 4, 2013, WNHU broadcast an 11-hour live set featuring DJs of the founding decade of the station. This day-long event, which was held from 10:00 a.m. to 9:00 p.m. EST was in celebration of the station's 40th anniversary. WNHU first broadcast live on the air on June 4, 1973.

In 2023, WNHU commemorated its 50th anniversary, marking half a century since its inaugural broadcast. The celebration featured both in-person and on-air events, bringing together alumni, current students, and community members to reflect on the station's rich history and envision its future.

== Programming ==
As of 2026 programming on WNHU consists of shows produced and hosted by students and alumni of the University of New Haven. The station aims to provide hands on learning opportunities for members of the university community while maintaining its role as a student-operated college radio station.

== See also ==
- Campus radio
- List of college radio stations in the United States
