= Connecticut's 115th House of Representatives district =

American legislative district

Connecticut's 115th State House of Representatives district
Representative
William Heffernan III; D

Connecticut's 115th House of Representatives district elects one member of the Connecticut House of Representatives. It encompasses parts of West Haven and has been represented by Democrat William Heffernan III since 2024.

== List of representatives ==
List of representatives from Connecticut's 115th State House district
Representative	Party	Years	District home	Note
Louis J. Piazza	Democratic	1967–1973	West Haven	Seat created
Edward F. Donovan	Republican	1973–1975	West Haven	
Vito M. Mazza	Democratic	1975–1981	West Haven	
Alexander F. Zarnowski	Republican	1981–1983	West Haven	
Mary Jane Kelly	Democratic	1983–1985	West Haven	
Joseph D. Nardini	Republican	1985–1987	West Haven	
Vito M. Mazza	Democratic	1987–1991	West Haven	
Stephen Dargan	Democratic	1991–2019	West Haven	
Dorinda Keenan Borer	Democratic	2019–2023	West Haven	Resigned after being elected mayor of West Haven
William Heffernan III	Democratic	2024–	West Haven	Elected in special election

== Recent elections ==
=== 2020 ===
2020 Connecticut State House of Representatives election, District 115
Party	Candidate	Votes	%
Democratic	Dorinda Keenan Borer (incumbent)	6,487	88.83
Working Families	Dorinda Keenan Borer (incumbent)	816	11.17
Total votes		7,303	100.00
Democratic hold			

=== 2018 ===
2018 Connecticut House of Representatives election, District 115
Party	Candidate	Votes	%
Democratic	Dorinda Keenan Borer (Incumbent)	5,140	71.8
Republican	Lynne Schlosser	2,016	28.2
Total votes		7,156	100.00
Democratic hold			

=== 2017 special ===
2017 Connecticut House of Representatives special elections, District 115
Party	Candidate	Votes	%
Democratic	Dorinda Keenan Borer	1,973	64.4
Republican	Edward Granfield	1,093	35.6
Total votes		3,066	100.00
Democratic hold			

=== 2016 ===
2016 Connecticut House of Representatives election, District 115
Party	Candidate	Votes	%
Democratic	Stephen Dargan (Incumbent)	5,798	70.82
Republican	Bart Chadderton	2,289	29.18
Total votes		8,187	100.00
Democratic hold			

=== 2014 ===
2014 Connecticut House of Representatives election, District 115
Party	Candidate	Votes	%
Democratic	Stephen Dargan (Incumbent)	4,490	100.00
Total votes		4,490	100.00
Democratic hold			

=== 2012 ===
2012 Connecticut House of Representatives election, District 115
Party	Candidate	Votes	%
Democratic	Stephen Dargan (Incumbent)	5,846	78.1
Republican	Joseph Palmucci Sr.	1,639	21.9
Total votes		7,485	100.00
Democratic hold			
