= John M. Picard =

American politician

John M. Picard is an American politician. He served as the tenth mayor of West Haven, Connecticut from December 2005 to December 2013.

== Career ==
Picard is a graduate of Notre Dame High School and the University of New Haven, both in West Haven. Prior to becoming mayor, he served as Chairman of the West Haven Water Pollution Control Commission. In 1997, he was elected to the West Haven City Council. He was re-elected to the Council in 1999 and 2001. In 2001, the City Council elected Picard Chairman of the City Council.

Picard was elected in 2005, succeeding Joseph Cullen who had served as mayor for a period of only two weeks. Cullen was Chairman of the West Haven City Council when H. Richard Borer, Jr. retired from office after he lost the general mayoral election to Picard. Borer, a Democrat, was elected mayor in 1991. Picard challenged him in the 2003 Democratic primary, but lost.

Choosing not to endure another primary, Borer formed his own political party called A Better Future Party in 2005. A Better Future Party ran a full slate of candidates in the 2005 General Election. Although the party took the minority positions on the City Council and Board of Education, Borer lost to Picard by 73 votes. In 2007, Picard was re-elected after being challenged by A Better Future candidate Dorinda Borer, wife of former mayor H. Richard Borer, Jr..

At the Democratic Party nominating convention, Picard shocked the crowd after he announced that he would not run for re-election. Within days, he changed his mind and accepted the nomination of the party. He defeated the A Better Future Party candidate, City Councilwoman Nancy Rossi and Republican Planning & Zoning Commissioner Steven Mullins. Rossi ran on the A Better Future ticket for mayor and the Democratic ticket for her council seat that she was re-elected to.

=== 2013 Reelection Bid ===
After losing the primary against fellow Democrat Edward M. O'Brien, Picard ran as a write in candidate. In 2013, Picard ran against O'Brien in a close election; O’Brien won 44.9 percent of the votes, while Picard earned 43.5 percent of the total tally.

== Personal life ==
Picard is married to Tara Riley Picard. He is a financial advisor and teaches English as a second language.

== See also ==
Preceded by Joseph Cullen	Mayor of the City of West Haven; 2005–present	Incumbent
