= Nick Pietrosante =

American football player (1937–1988)

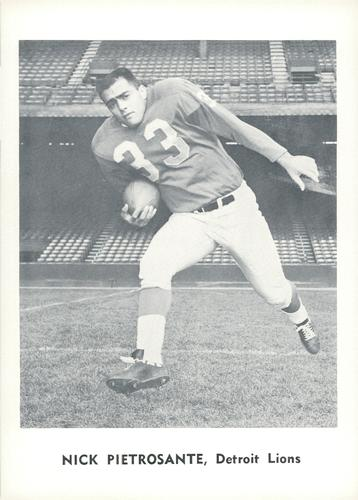
- Pietrosante in 1961

No. 33, 36
- Position: Fullback

Personal information
- Born: September 10, 1937; Ansonia, Connecticut, U.S.
- Died: February 6, 1988 (aged 50); Royal Oak, Michigan, U.S.
- Listed height: 6 ft 2 in (1.88 m)
- Listed weight: 225 lb (102 kg)

Career information
- High school: Notre Dame (West Haven, Connecticut)
- College: Notre Dame (1956–1958)
- NFL draft: 1959: 1st round, 6th overall pick

Career history
- Detroit Lions (1959–1965); Cleveland Browns (1966–1967)

Awards and highlights
- SN NFL Rookie of the Year (1959); 2× Pro Bowl (1960, 1961); Detroit Lions All-Time Team; First-team All-American (1958); Third-team All-American (1957)

Career NFL statistics
- Rushing yards: 4,026
- Rushing average: 4.2
- Rushing touchdowns: 28
- Receptions: 141
- Receiving yards: 1,319
- Receiving touchdowns: 2
- Stats at Pro Football Reference

Nicholas Vincent Pietrosante (/pɛtroʊˈsɑːnteɪ/ peh-troh-SAHN-tay; September 10, 1937 – February 6, 1988) was an American professional football player who was a fullback in the National Football League (NFL) for the Detroit Lions and the Cleveland Browns. He was the NFL Rookie of the Year in 1959, and a Pro Bowler in 1960 and 1961. Between 1959 and 1965, he set a Lions franchise record with 3,933 rushing yards. He played college football for the Notre Dame Fighting Irish and was named third-team All-American in 1958.

== Early life ==
Pietrosante was born in Ansonia, Connecticut, in 1937, and attended Notre Dame High School in West Haven, Connecticut. In his senior year at Notre Dame High School, he scored 23 touchdowns in nine games, became the school's first all-state athlete in any sport, and led the 1954 football team to an undefeated season, outscoring opponents 332–12.

== Notre Dame ==
Pietrosante attended the University of Notre Dame where he played football as a fullback for the Fighting Irish football team from 1956 to 1958. As a junior in 1957, he recovered a fumble, delivered a key block on Notre Dame's touchdown, and was the leading rusher in a 7–0 victory that broke Oklahoma's record 47-game winning streak. For the 1957 season, he rushed for 449 yards on 90 carries and was selected by the United Press as a third-team All-American. As a senior in 1958, he rushed for 556 yards on 117 carries and was selected by the American Football Coaches Association and Football Writers Association of America as the first-team fullback on the 1958 College Football All-America Team.

== Professional football ==
Pietrosante was selected by the Detroit Lions in the first round, sixth overall pick, of the 1959 NFL draft. As a rookie in 1959, he rushed for 134 yards against the Green Bay Packers on Thanksgiving Day, the best rushing total recorded by a Lion since Bob Hoernschemeyer rushed for 198 yards in 1950. After the game, Green Bay coach Vince Lombardi said, "That boy shall be a great one some day. He is very tough to bring down." He also led the NFL with an average of 5.9 rushing yards per carry and won the 1959 National Football League Rookie of the Year Award.

In 1960, Pietrosante had three 100-yard rushing games, including a career-high 142 yards and two touchdowns against the Dallas Cowboys. For the 1960 season, he rushed for 872 yards, a Lions single-season record and the fourth highest total in the NFL that year. He was also selected to play in the Pro Bowl and was named the most valuable player on the 1960 Lions team.

In 1961, Pietrosante rushed for 841 yards, again the fourth most in the NFL, and was selected to play in the Pro Bowl for the second consecutive year. Between 1959 and 1965, Pietrosante set a Lions' franchise record with 3,933 rushing yards.

In September 1966, shortly before the start of the 1966 NFL regular season, the Lions' head coach Harry Gilmer placed Pietrosante on waivers. Days later, he was signed by the Cleveland Browns, who had lost the services of Jim Brown after the 1965 season. However, Pietrosante saw limited action for the Browns, carrying the ball only 17 times for 93 yards during the 1966 and 1967 seasons. In July 1968, Pietrosante announced at age 30 that he was retiring from the NFL.

== NFL career statistics ==
Legend
	Led the league
**Bold**	Career high

Year	Team	Games		Rushing					Receiving				
Year	Team	GP	GS	Att	Yds	Avg	Lng	TD	Rec	Yds	Avg	Lng	TD
1959	DET	10	5	76	447	5.9	37	3	16	140	8.8	20	0
1960	DET	12	11	161	**872**	5.4	**57**	**8**	13	129	9.9	28	0
1961	DET	14	14	**201**	841	4.2	42	5	**26**	**315**	**12.1**	**76**	0
1962	DET	13	11	134	445	3.3	22	2	**26**	251	9.7	26	**2**
1963	DET	11	11	112	418	3.7	22	5	16	173	10.8	24	0
1964	DET	14	14	147	536	3.6	21	4	19	152	8.0	20	0
1965	DET	14	9	107	374	3.5	12	1	18	163	9.1	54	0
1966	CLE	13	0	7	20	2.9	8	0	1	12	12.0	12	0
1967	CLE	14	0	10	73	**7.3**	31	0	6	56	9.3	23	0
		115	75	955	4,026	4.2	57	28	141	1,391	9.9	76	2

== Family and later years ==
Pietrosante was married to Geraldine Marie Cox, a nurse from Connecticut, in 1957. They had two daughters, Stacy and Cindy, and one son, Nicholas Judd. After retiring from the NFL, he began a business career in the Detroit area. His business interests included an insurance agency (the Schmidt-Barr-Pietrosante Agency) operated with former teammates Joe Schmidt and Terry Barr, a manufacturers representative company (Nick Pietrosante Associates), and a partial ownership interest in the Dearborn Racquet Club.

In February 1988, Pietrosante died of prostate cancer at Beaumont Hospital in Royal Oak, Michigan, at age 50.
