= Farnum House =

Historic house in Connecticut, United States

- U.S. National Register of Historic Places
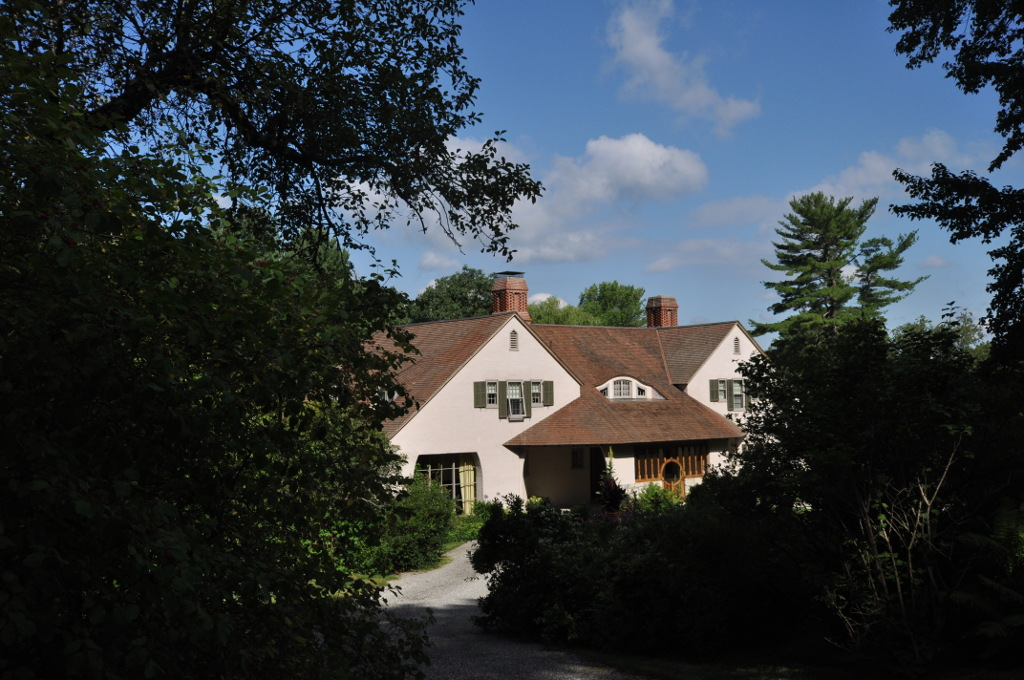

- Location within Connecticut Location within the United States
- Location: Litchfield Road, Norfolk, Connecticut
- Coordinates: 41°58′44″N 73°12′4″W
- Area: 2 acres (0.81 ha)
- Built: 1908
- Architect: Taylor, A.S.G.
- MPS: Taylor, Alfredo S. G., TR
- NRHP reference No.: 82004449
- Added to NRHP: August 2, 1982

The Farnum House is a historic house on Litchfield Road in Norfolk, Connecticut. Built in 1908 to a design by Alfredo S.G. Taylor, it is a distinctive local example of a Tudor Revival English country house. It was listed on the National Register of Historic Places in 1982, for its association with the architect.

== Description and history ==
The Farnum House is located south of the village center of Norfolk, on the west side of Litchfield Road (Connecticut Route 272). It is set on a 2-acre (0.81 ha) lot that slopes down from the road, with a semicircular front drive providing access. A fringe of mature plantings lines the street between the two drive entrances. The house is a 1 1/2-story wood-frame structure, its exterior finished in stucco. Its main roof ridge is oriented parallel to the road, but its facade is dominated by large front-facing cross-gabled sections at either end, with an eyebrow dormer in between. The roof below the eyebrow extends over a broad porte-cochere, whose ends extend in front of the flanking gables. The interior finishes are also reflective of the Tudor Revival, and some of its original interior furnishings were also designed by the architect Alfredo S.G. Taylor.

The house was built in 1908 to a design by Taylor, a prominent New York City architect who summered in Norfolk. It is one of three stucco houses designed by Taylor in the years 1906-08 that are set on the west side of Litchfield Road. This house in particular bears a strong resemblance to Moor Crag, a house near Bowness-on-Windermere in Cumbria, England designed in 1898 by the English architect Charles Voysey, but presents its own distinctive interpretation of an English country house of the period.

== See also ==
- National Register of Historic Places listings in Litchfield County, Connecticut
