= Alan MacPherson =

American lawyer

Alan H. MacPherson (August 10, 1934 - December 8, 2008, Laguna Beach, California, United States) was an American patent attorney who pioneered the "clean room" defense.

== Early life ==
MacPherson was born in Calais, Maine on August 10, 1934. He received a full scholarship to attend Stanford University, where in 1956 he obtained his Bachelor of Science degree in mechanical engineering, supplementing his tuition by working in the gold and silver mines of Alaska and Idaho. Then, he obtained his Master of Science degree, also in Mechanical Engineering, from MIT. He held technical positions at Space Technology Laboratories in Redondo Beach, California, Dynamic Analysis and Control Laboratory at MIT and Pratt & Whitney Aircraft in East Hartford, Connecticut before attending Harvard Law School. In 1964, MacPherson received his Juris Doctor degree from Harvard Law School.

== Career ==
MacPherson began his career as patent counsel at Bell Labs in Murray Hill, New Jersey. Then, he moved to California to become one of the first patent attorneys at Fairchild Semiconductor, when it was still known as "Fairchild Camera and Instrument Corporation" and before it split off into National Semiconductor and other semiconductor companies.

In 1980, MacPherson founded the IP Group of Skjerven Morrill MacPherson LLP and served as the firm's chairman. Skjerven became a leading patent and IP boutique law firms in Silicon Valley, riding the wave of the dot-com boom. Its client list included NEC, AMD, SanDisk, Mosel Vitelic Corporation and Xilinx. In 2002, the Skjerven partnership voted to replace MacPherson, citing differences over the direction of the firm. The breakup was complicated, as it involved a suit filed by MacPherson against his former partners. His suit, alleging breach of fiduciary duty, defamation, negligent or intentional infliction of emotional distress, invasion of privacy, harassment in violation of FEHA and misrepresentation was sent by the court to arbitration and the Arbitrator, the Hon. John A. Flaherty (Ret.), entered an award for the defendant partners, denying MacPherson's request for relief in its entirety. MacPherson left and began the firm MacPherson Kwok Chen & Heid LLP with offices in San Jose, California and Irvine, California. According to several commentators, MacPherson's departure from Skjerven, taking his clients to his new firm, led to the 2003 dissolution of Skjerven.

MacPherson co-founded Intellectual Property Acquisitions, Inc. with Dr. Nicola Orsini in late 2002 and served as its non-executive chairman. He also served as Chief IP Strategist at Scintera Networks, Inc., a high speed communications semiconductor company.

== Clean room defense ==
MacPherson was credited with pioneering the "clean room" defense when he represented NEC in an IP lawsuit against Intel in the early 1980s. In the suit, Intel alleged that NEC stole and infringed its programming in its microprocessors, or "microcode". To rebut this accusation, MacPherson gave an independent engineer the task of programming an IC (Integrated Circuit) to do the same thing as the NEC and Intel Chips, but cutting off all access to any previously written microcode - in other words, simulating clean room conditions. After the engineer completed the task, experts concluded that the similarities between the microcode was not because of copying but due to the intrinsic constraints of programming microcode.

== Legacy ==
MacPherson died on December 8, 2008. He mentored several generations of IP and patent attorneys practicing in California and Texas. In his late 60s, he set a record for billing more than 3,000 hours a year. He also climbed Tanzania's Mount Kilimanjaro. In 2009, MacPherson Kwok Chen & Heid LLP merged with Texas-based law firm Haynes and Boone LLP.
