= Joel S. Douglas =

Joel S. Douglas is an American patent agent and business executive who pioneered the first alternate-site glucose meter used to treat millions of Americans affected by diabetes.

== Early life and education ==
Douglas graduated from the University of Connecticut with a Bachelor of Science in civil engineering in 1977. He earned his Master's degree in computer science from the University of New Haven in 1982.

== LifeScan ==
As a program manager at Johnson & Johnson's blood glucose monitoring company, LifeScan, Douglas was part of the team that won the Shingo Prize for Operational Excellence in 1995. LifeScan was later purchased for $2.1 billion by the global investment firm Platinum Equity in 2018.

== Career ==
In 1996, Douglas and Karen Drexler co-founded the diabetes monitoring company Amira Medical Inc. The company was a privately held corporation with about 160 employees. In 2001, Amira Medical was acquired by the Swiss healthcare company Roche for an undisclosed sum.

In 2004, the Medical Device and Diagnostic Industry (MD+DI) named Douglas one of the 100 most notable people in the medical device industry. He is the inventor of 103 patents.

Douglas is a University of Connecticut Academy of Distinguished Engineers member and sits on the National Association of Patent Practitioners' board of directors.

Joel is the founder and president of Menlo Park Patents, a patent services provider.

In 2010, Joel and his wife Heidi established the Joel S. and Heidi S. Douglas Engineering Scholarship at the University of Connecticut.
