= Victor J. Evans =

American businessman and collector (1865–1931)

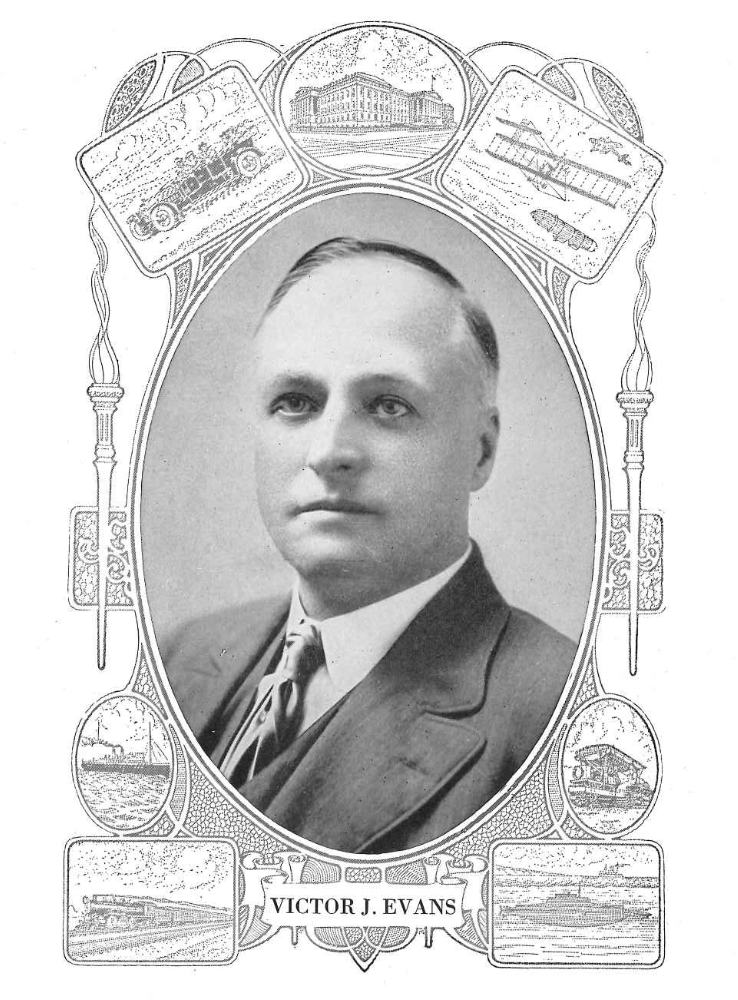
Victor Justice Evans, from 'How to Obtain A Patent'

Victor Justice Evans (1865-1931) was the founder of one of the largest U.S. patent agencies of his time. Victor J. Evans & Company, Patent Attorneys, was founded in 1898. Evans built up a thriving business based in part on his willingness to offer full refunds to inventors if they were unsuccessful in securing the patents they desired.

By the 1920s, Evans' firm was described as the “largest patent firm in the world”. In addition to its headquarters location in Washington, D.C., it had offices in New York, Philadelphia, Pittsburgh, Chicago and San Francisco. The Victor Building, headquarters of the firm, has a long history as an important Washington DC office building. It was initially completed in 1909 at Grant Place NW (now G Place) and 9th Street near the Patent Office. It was expanded twice, in 1911 by architect Appleton P. Clark Jr., and in 1925 by architect Waddy Butler Wood.

Evans' interests included aeronautics, exotic animals, and Native American artifacts and artworks. He had his own private zoo. His collection of art and artifacts was considered one of the largest in the world at the time. He was a significant supporter of the Smithsonian National Zoo, the Smithsonian American Art Museum, and the Smithsonian National Museum of Natural History leaving them animals from his private zoo and art and artifacts from his Native American collection on his death.

== Patents and patent law ==
Victor Justice Evans was born in Delaware, Ohio, and lived in Minnesota before his family moved to Washington, D.C. Evans became a patent draftsman when he was 18, working with the firm J. Henry Kiser. There he learned about patents and patent law.

Evans founded Victor J. Evans & Company, Patent Attorneys, in 1898, and developed it into one of the largest U.S. patent agencies by the 1920s. He offered inventors full refunds if the agency was unsuccessful in securing the patents they desired. Victor J. Evans and Company had a specialty for inventions related to aeronautics. He was a financial contributor to and president of the Rex Smith Aeroplane Company of Washington.

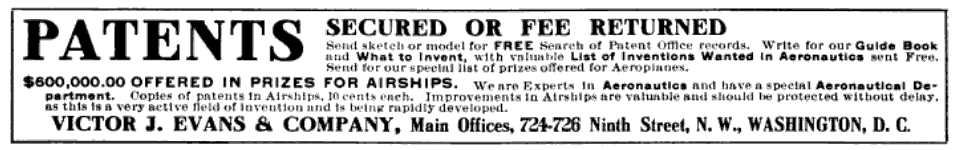
Advertisement by patent agency Victor J. Evans and Company, 1911

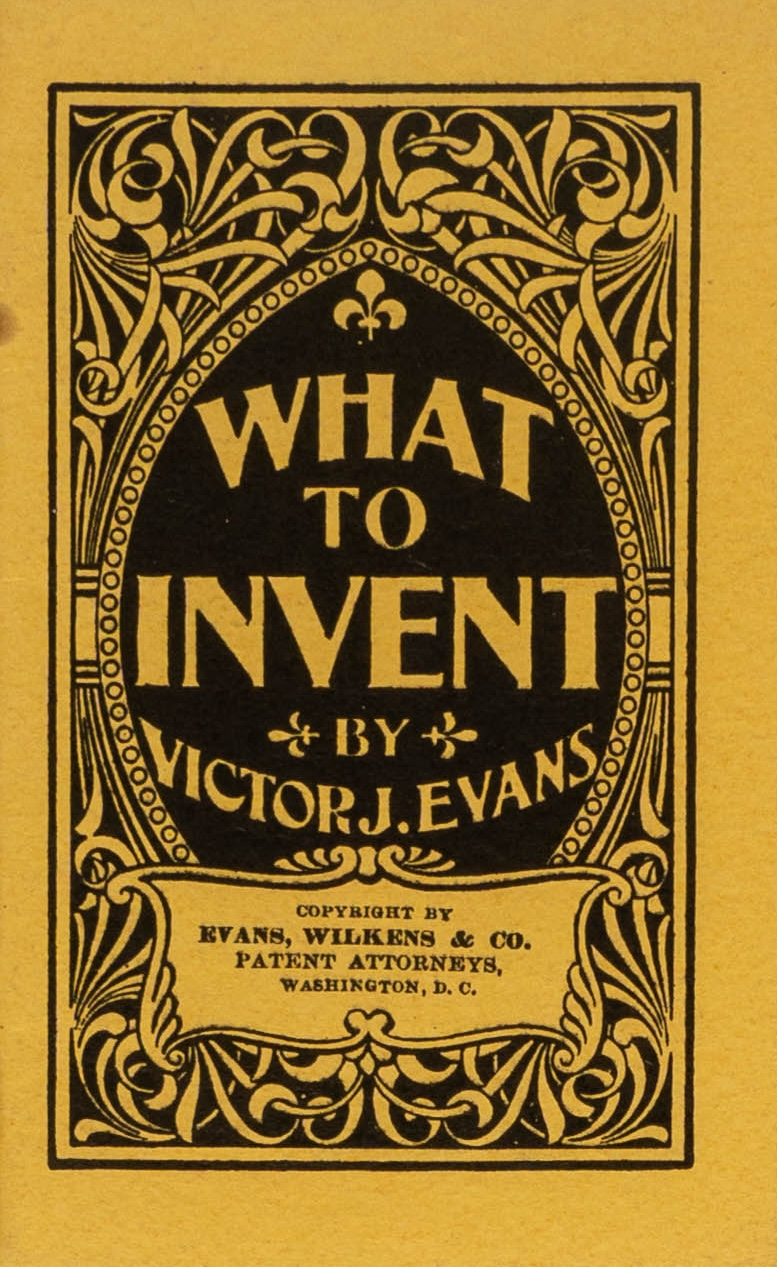
Victor Evans, What to Invent, 1914

Evans published several books on patents including Money in patents. 1914. OCLC 681906320., What to invent : the evolution of invention ... 1914. OCLC 898384802., and the 80-page illustrated How to Obtain a Patent (1910).

== The Victor Building ==
Evans planned and funded the Victor building which was used as the company headquarters for Victor J. Evans and Company. In 1907, Evans bought a site at Grant Place NW (now G Place) and 9th Street in Washington, D.C., right next to the Patent Office, for construction of his new headquarters. The Victor Building was completed in 1909 at a cost of $150,000. The six-story Renaissance Revival building is still standing, and has a long history as an important Washington DC office building. It was expanded twice by Evans, in 1911 and in 1925. The original building and the 1911 expansion were the work of architect Appleton P. Clark Jr. The 1925 expansion was done by Waddy Butler Wood.

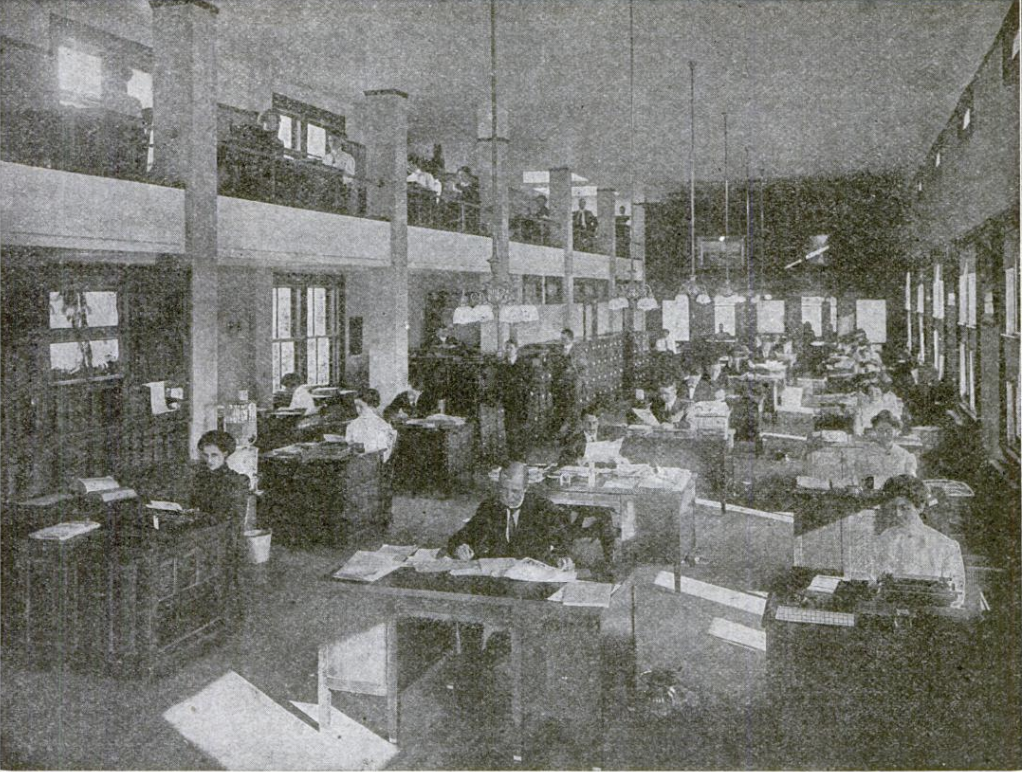
The specifications department, Victor J. Evans Co., 1910

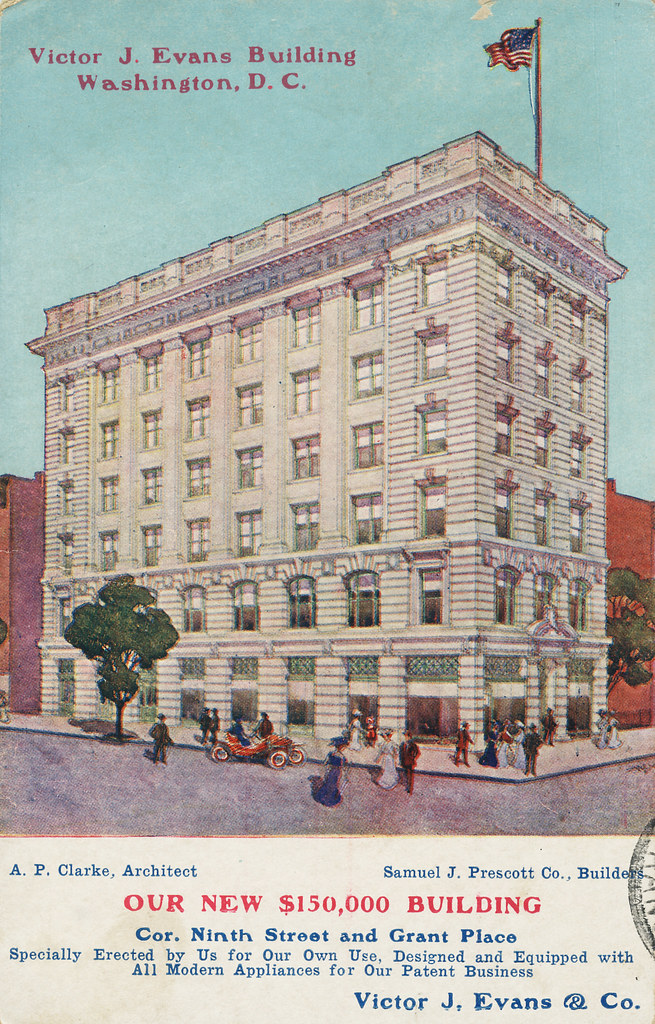
Victor Building, 9th street and Grant, ca. 1910

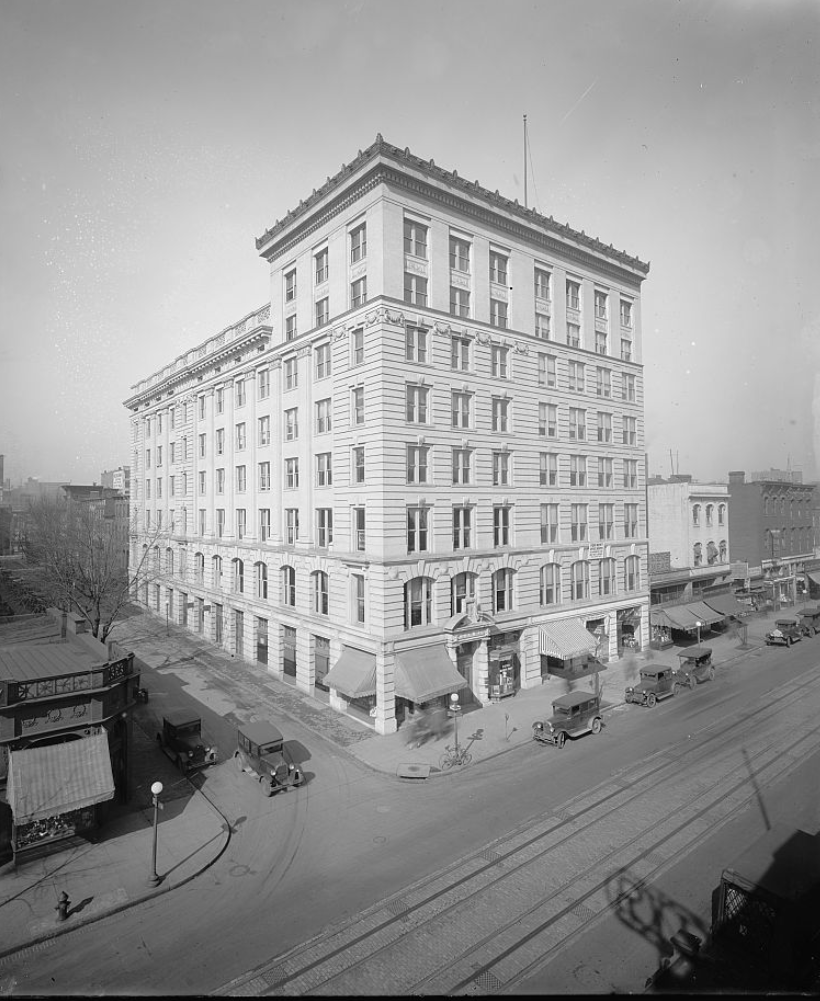
Victor Building, between 1910 and 1925

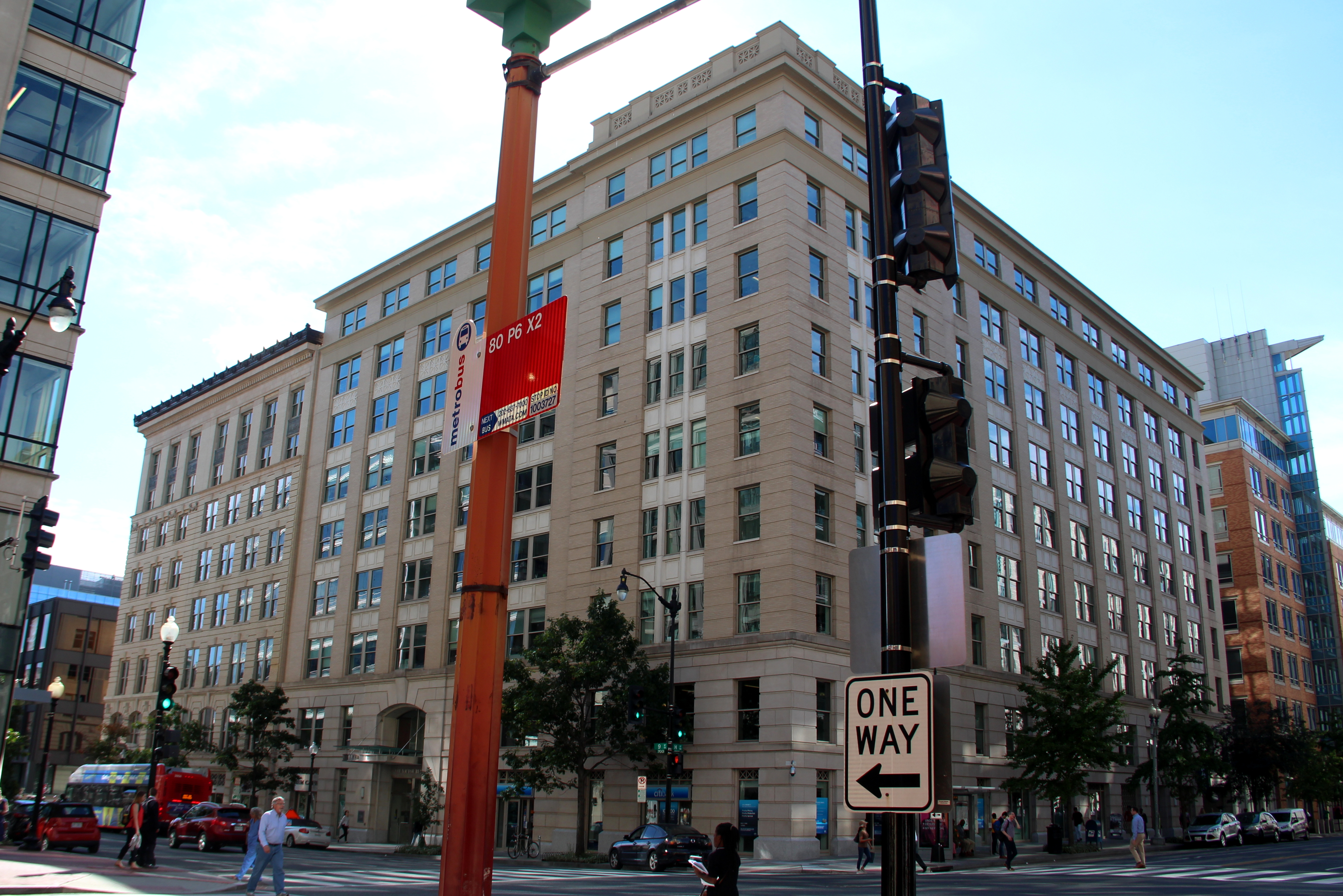
Victor Building 750 9th Street NW Washington, 2019

== Collections and philanthropy ==
Evans was active in a number of areas in addition to his patent work. He was interested in exotic animals, and had his own private 10-acre zoo west of Foxhall Road off Hawthorne Lane NW. He became a significant supporter of the Smithsonian National Zoo and left the majority of his animals to the zoo at his death, excepting any that his wife Zenobia wished to keep.

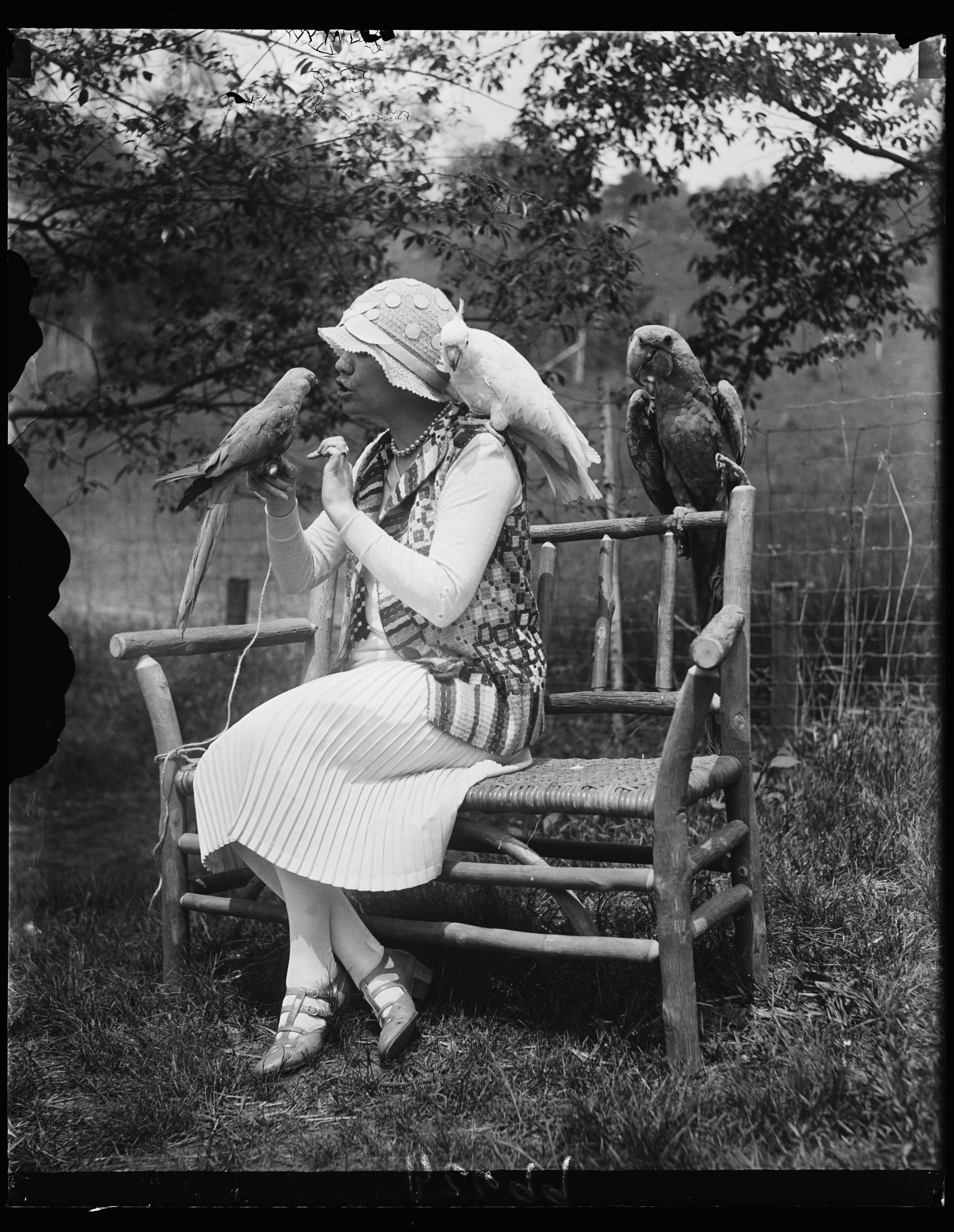
Mrs. Evans, with macaws from their private zoo

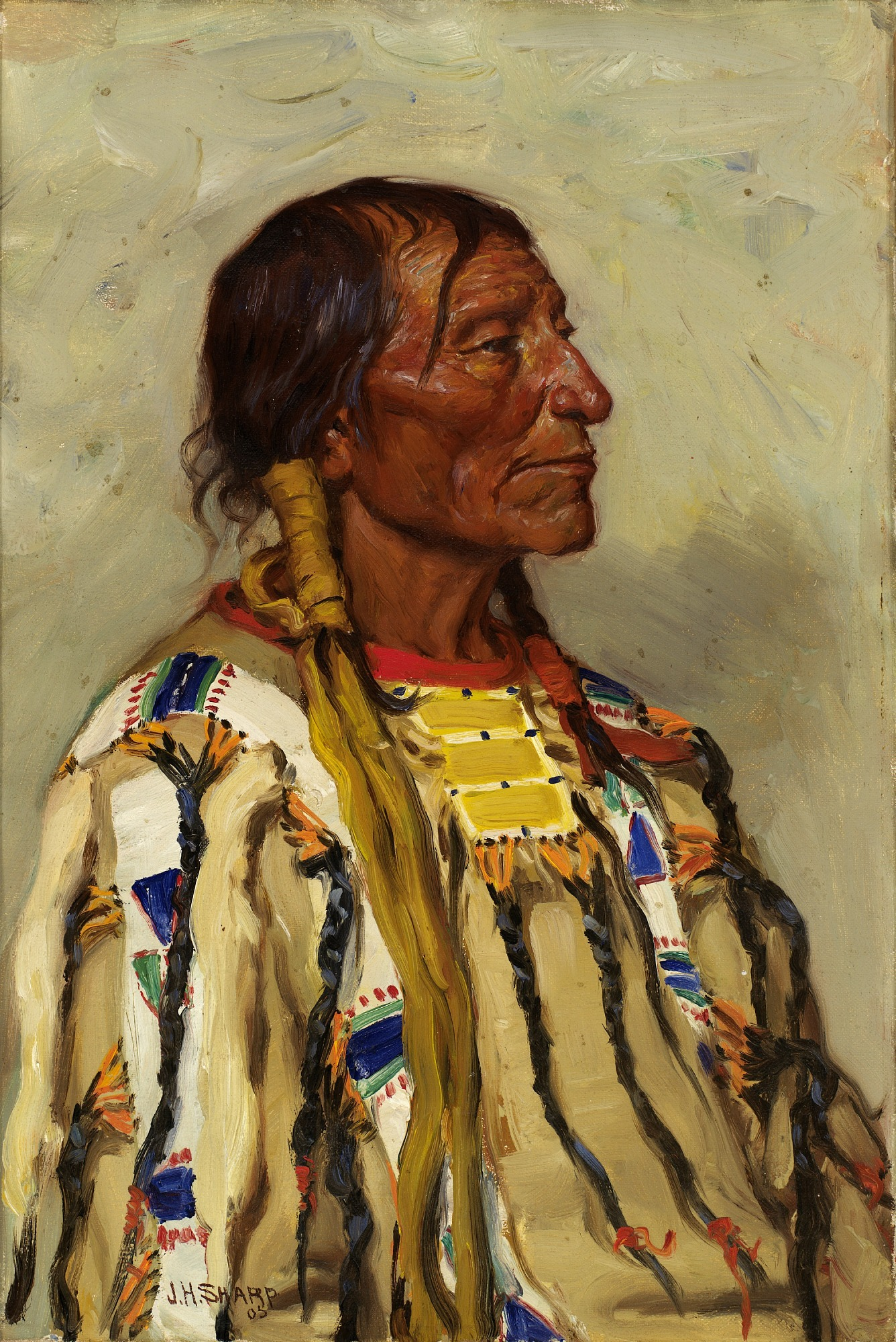
Joseph Henry Sharp, 'Chief Flat Iron', 1905, one of Evans' donations to the Smithsonian

Evans was an avid collector of photos and art, in particular Native American artifacts and artworks. His collection was considered to be one of the largest in the world. As a result of this interest, he became an advocate for Native American tribes. Unsuccessful in convincing the federal government to establish a site to host his extensive collections during his lifetime, he left them to the Smithsonian Institution at his death.
