= Schwegman, Lundberg & Woessner =

Schwegman, Lundberg & Woessner, P.A.
- Headquarters: Minneapolis, Minnesota, U.S.
- Offices: 2
- No. of attorneys: 100
- Date founded: 1993
- Website: www.slwip.com

Schwegman Lundberg & Woessner, P.A. (Formerly Schwegman, Lundberg, Woessner & Kluth, P.A.) is a Minneapolis, Minnesota based intellectual property law firm. It was founded in December 1993. The firm was one of the first patent law firms in the United States to focus solely on patent prosecution and not on patent litigation (adopting a practice fairly common in Europe).

== Locations ==
The Schwegman firm has offices located in Minneapolis, Minnesota and Silicon Valley, California, and satellite practitioners throughout the United States.

== Recognition ==
- Top quality ranking from IAM / Ocean Tomo (2015, 2016. 2017).
- Ranked in the top twenty in US Utility Patent filings by IPWatchdog (2017)
- Innovators in Health & Wellness – Excellence in Professional Service award by Minnesota Business magazine (2017)
