= Vriesendorp & Gaade =

Octrooibureau Vriesendorp & Gaade B.V.
- Founded: The Hague, Netherlands in 1833
- Headquarters: Koninginnegracht 19; 2514 AB The Hague, Netherlands
- Website: www.vriesendorp.nl

The old logo

Octrooibureau Vriesendorp & Gaade B.V. is a Dutch patent attorney agency, founded in 1833. The firm was not continuously active as a patent attorney agency, because the Netherlands abolished patents in 1869, and did not reintroduce them until 1912.

== History ==
The Netherlands have known patents for a long period of time. As early as the Middle Ages patents were granted at regular times and famous names can be found among the patentees, like Leeghwater, Huygens, De Keyser, Stevin and Drebbel. In 1817 a Patents Act came into force under King William I. Under this Act the Firm of Vriesendorp & Gaade was engaged in applying for patents.

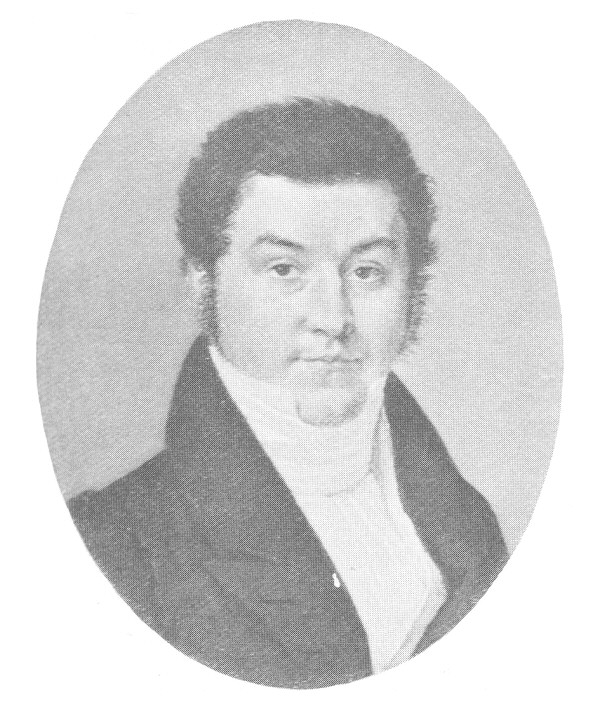
Mr. Anthony Nicolaas Vriesendorp (1806-1845)

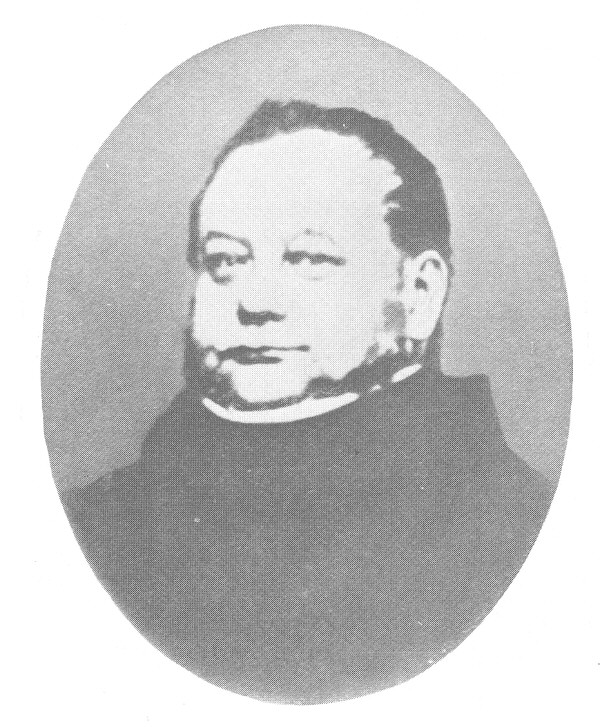
Mr. Jan Hendrik Gaade (1800-1861)

=== First patent application and foundation in 1833 ===
The Firm of Vriesendorp & Gaade filed the first patent application in which they acted as representatives on September 27, 1833. The patent in question was granted by the King on November 9, 1833, under the Dutch Patent Act of 1817 It concerned a so-called patent of importation granted to F.M.N. van Aken, who had become familiar with an apparatus for refining sugar and distilling spirits in France described in a French patent which was applied for on 4 February 1833. Ever since the name of the Firm of Vriesendorp & Gaade has been mentioned in the patent records as a patent agent office.

The founders of the Firm were Anthony Vriesendorp (1806–1845), springing from an old Dordrecht patrician race, who graduated as a doctor at law at Leyden and Jan Gaade (1800–1861), at whose house at The Hague, Westeinde 10 the office of the Firm initially had its seat. In 1833 the profession of Mr. Vriesendorp and Mr. Gaade was indicated as 'commission agent' and their activities covered a great domain.

=== Appointed 'government solicitor' in 1837 ===
An important fact for the Firm took place on 6 August 1837, when Mr. A.N. Vriesendorp was appointed government solicitor in the Residentie in The Hague. Article 3 of the Royal Decree of 5 September 1823 defines the function of government solicitor as follows: No petitions or statements may be filed with Us or the various State Departments or may be accepted, unless they have been signed by the petitioners personally or on behalf of them by the government solicitor.

Thus, solicitors were intermediaries between the public and the government who were appointed by the government and were in charge of properly drawing up and filing petitions to the government. By virtue of the Patents Act of 1817 a patent was a favour that could be granted by the King and so drafting and filing patent applications also belonged to a solicitor's work. So, it was a logical development that after Mr. Vriesendorp's appointment as a solicitor in 1837 more and more patents were applied for by the Firm of Vriesendorp & Gaade.

=== Patent no. 1 under the Dutch Patent Act of 1910 ===
The Netherlands also became a party to the Convention of Paris of March 20th 1883, by which an international regulation of industrial property rights came into being and came into force in the Netherlands. On 3 May 1905 the bill for a Patents Act was introduced. After the Patents Act of 1910 had come into force the office resumed the old branch of the solicitor's profession, filing patent applications.

So, in the Netherlands the 'patent agent' appeared instead of the 'government solicitor'. F.L. Kleyn, patent attorney at the Firm of Vriesendorp & Gaade filed a patent application, which would become granted patent no. 1 under the new Dutch Patent Act of 1910.

In order to express that the Firm of Vriesendorp & Gaade had resumed the handling of patent matters in the Netherlands, the name was changed into Octrooibureau Vriesendorp & Gaade.

=== The World Wars ===
In spite of World War I Octrooibureau continued to develop. The firm took over the patent department of Van der Graaf in 1917.

During World War II, communications with many countries gradually got interrupted, but until almost the end of the war work could be done. Two months before the end of World War II, on March 3, 1945, The Hague was heavily stricken by an allied bombardment, which in particular struck the immediate surroundings of the accommodation and the adjoining offices of Vriesendorp & Gaade, which got a direct hit. The blaze occurring as a result thereof reduced the accommodation of Octrooibureau Vriesendorp & Gaade to ashes in a couple of hours. With assistance from Dutch Patent Office, colleagues/patent agents and clients, the records and the administration were reconstructed.

=== Post World War II developments ===
After the end of World War II, important developments in the field of industrial property, such as the Treaty of Rome of 1957, Patent Cooperation Treaty of 1970 and the European Patent Convention of 1973 caused the nature of the firm's business activities to change.

At present (2010) Octrooibureau Vriesendorp & Gaade B.V. has two offices, one in The Hague and one in Apeldoorn. The staff of Octrooibureau Vriesendorp & Gaade consists of approximately 40 employee, active in its traditional business in the field of industrial property.
