= University of New Haven =

Private university in West Haven, Connecticut, US

- Former names: New Haven Junior College (1920–1926); New Haven College (1926–1970)
- Type: Private university
- Established: 1920
- Academic affiliations: Space-grant
- Endowment: $94 million
- President: Jens Frederiksen
- Faculty: 244 (full-time)
- Students: 6,719
- Undergraduates: 4,972
- Postgraduates: 1,747
- Location: West Haven, Connecticut, United States; 41.2919°N 72.9622°W
- Campus: Suburban
- Colors: Blue and gold
- Nickname: Chargers
- Sporting affiliations: NCAA Division I – Northeast
- Mascot: Charlie the Charger
- Website: www.newhaven.edu
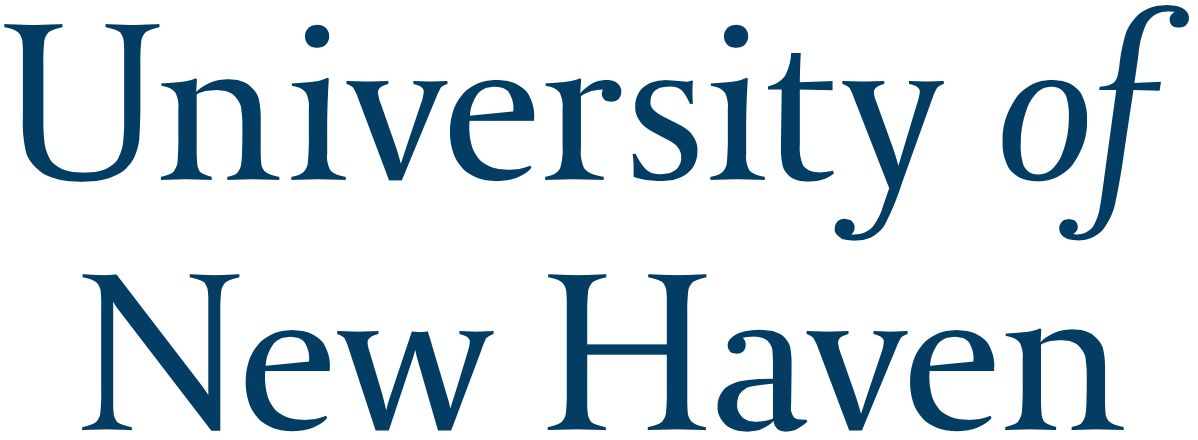

The University of New Haven (UNH) is a private university in West Haven, Connecticut, United States.

== History ==
The University of New Haven was founded in 1920 as the New Haven Junior College, a division of Northeastern University, which shared buildings, laboratories, and faculty members on the campus of Yale University for nearly 40 years.

== Academics ==
Academic rankings

Regional
- U.S. News & World Report: 87

The University of New Haven has 109 undergraduate programs and 116 graduate programs.

The university is accredited by the New England Commission of Higher Education, a successor of the Commission on Institutions of Higher Education of the New England Association of Schools and Colleges, and has been since 1948.

In 2015, the University of New Haven's College of Business received accreditation from AACSB International, and in 2025 that accreditation was renewed through the 2030–2031 academic year.

== Rankings and reputation ==
In its 2027 Best Colleges Rankings, U.S. News & World Report' elevated to the University of New Haven to its National Universities category for the first time, including it in a select group of approximately 425 institutions recognized among the nation’s best.

== Campus ==
The University of New Haven currently houses 48 campus buildings, including the Henry C. Lee Institute of Forensic Science – and the newest building, the Bergami Center for Science, Technology, and Innovation. This includes 14 on- and off-campus, university-sponsored residence halls.

=== Henry C. Lee Institute of Forensic Science ===
The Henry C. Lee Institute of Forensic Science was dedicated on October 15, 2010.

The Henry C. Lee Institute of Forensic Science opened on the campus of the University of New Haven in the fall of 1998. The institute was dedicated on October 15, 2010, and consists of a crime scene center, crisis management center, museum, laboratories, classrooms, and a 104-seat lecture hall.

== Athletics ==
The New Haven Chargers, the university's intercollegiate athletic teams, began competing in NCAA Division I as members of the Northeast Conference (NEC) on July 1, 2025. The school accepted an invitation to the NEC on May 6, 2025.

The Chargers field 20 athletics teams, 8 for men and 12 for women. New Haven began its transition to NCAA Division I and the NEC during the 2025–26 academic year. The Chargers will attain full Division I membership in 2028–29 following the NCAA-mandated reclassification period.

The school previously competed in NCAA Division II and was a member of the Northeast-10 Conference from 2008 to 2025.

In November 2025, the University of New Haven men's basketball team hosted Penn State in its second home game (third game overall) competing at the Division I level.

== Riyadh Campus ==
In August 2026, the University of New Haven became the first to open a U.S. international branch campus in Saudi Arabia. The University received approval for the campus from the New England Commission of Higher Education in April 2026. In May of 2026, the University secured space for its campus in Misk City in Riyadh. In October 2025, the University received approval to establish the campus from Saudi leaders, after announcing an MOU with the Saudi Ministries of Education and Investment to pursue create of an international branch campus.

== Elevation Center ==
In December 2024, the University of New Haven acquired at 133,000 square foot commercial space on Campbell Avenue adjacent to its campus where it is developing a Center for Innovation and Applied Technology, called the Elevation Center. The University has raised $10 million in private funding to support renovation of the space in addition to receiving a $5 million state grant.

== Student organizations ==
The University of New Haven had 199 clubs and organizations as of September 2023.

=== Greek life ===
Several recognized and unrecognized fraternities and sororities are at the university.

=== Student government ===
The University of New Haven has two student-run governing bodies: the Undergraduate Student Government Association (USGA), and the Graduate Student Council (GSC). Student organizations offices are located on the top floor of Bartels Hall, the university's student center.

=== Student newspaper ===
The Charger Bulletin is the official, student-run newspaper at the University of New Haven since 1938. It is published weekly in a quarter-folded tabloid format. Both undergraduate and graduate students write for the paper. The Bulletin comes out weekly on Tuesdays while classes are in session. The paper version of the Bulletin is distributed for free throughout the campus of UNH, and is also published online.

=== Marching band ===
The University of New Haven Chargers Marching Band has around 300 members.

=== Radio station ===
The university's noncommercial radio station, WNHU-FM, first signed onto the air at 16:00 EDT on July 4, 1973. The WNHU studios moved to their current home on Ruden Street into the Lois Evalyn Bergami Broadcast Media Center in 2015. Its location on Ruden Street includes a production space for live and recorded programming, a server room, staff offices, and a student lounge. WNHU is managed by a 10-person student leadership team. Positions include station manager, promotions director, aircheck director, WNHU program director, director of fundraising, program/music director, and productions director. The University of New Haven's communications department started to work with the radio station for students to have access to the station. The station operates as a laboratory for student learning, and as a source of culturally diverse programming for the communities served. WNHU is broadcast on 88.7 FM; it is considered the best college radio station in Connecticut according to the New Haven Advocate, which has awarded the station "Best College Radio Station" for over six consecutive years.

WNHU is known for eclectic programming, with shows ranging from new music, rock, gospel, funk, and talk shows to specialty formats such as polka and Irish music. Unlike many college or community radio stations where DJs change frequently, some WNHU personalities have hosted shows for years, many of whom are UNH alumni.

=== Bucknall Theater ===
Bucknall Theater, named in honor of William L. Bucknall, Jr., has about two productions a semester, and holds several functions for the university throughout the academic year. The space also doubles as a learning space for many of the classes pertaining to the Arts Department, more specifically theatre minors. It is used as a lecture hall and is equipped with pull-out desks on each of the 250 seats.

=== Black Student Union ===
On April 22, 2023, the BSU celebrated its 50th anniversary during the annual Sankofa Ball held during the university's Black and Latino Alumni Weekend.

== Notable alumni ==
The University of New Haven has about 64,000 alumni. Among its notable alumni are:

- Ameera al-Taweel, Saudi Arabian royalty
- Patrick Arnold, steroid chemistry
- Steve Bedrosian (baseball), won the National League Cy Young Award in 1987
- Harry Boatswain (football)
- Dorinda Keenan Borer (politician), current mayor of West Haven, Conn.
- Richard Borer, former mayor of West Haven, Conn. and current non-profit executive
- Jamaal Bowman (politician)
- Kenton Clarke (CEO, Computer Consulting Associates International Inc.)
- Thomas H. Collins, former admiral of the United States Coast Guard
- Mark S. DeFrancesco (politician)
- Joel S. Douglas (patent agent), pioneered the first alternate-site glucose meter
- Cameron Drew (baseball)
- Vivian Davis Figures (politician)
- Henry Genga (politician)
- Thomas J. Gibson, chancellor of the University of Wisconsin–Milwaukee and the University of Wisconsin–Stevens Point
- Lubbie Harper Jr., (judge), former associate justice for the Connecticut Supreme Court
- Darren M. Haynes, sportscaster for CBS affiliate KCAL in Los Angeles
- Wayne Johnsen (boxing)
- Viren Kapadia (CEO)
- Tom Lanzara (politician)
- Dean Lombardi (hockey), former general manager of the NHL's Los Angeles Kings
- James McCaffrey (actor)
- Miles McPherson (football)
- Nitza Morán (politician), member of the Senate of Puerto Rico
- Selim Noujaim (politician)
- Neil O'Leary (politician), former mayor of Waterbury, Conn.
- Anthony Ornato, former assistant director of the United States Secret Service Office of Training
- John M. Picard (politician) former mayor of West Haven, Conn.
- Michael J. Rubio (politician)
- Erick Russell (politician), Connecticut State Treasurer
- L. Timothy Ryan (master chef), president of the Culinary Institute of America (CIA)
- Adrian Serioux (soccer)
- Tony Sparano (NFL coach)
- Roberto Taylor (soccer)
- Merryl Tengesdal (Air Force Veteran), first and only Black woman to fly the United States Air Force's U-2 spy plane
- Dave Wallace (baseball)

== Faculty and staff ==
The student-to-faculty ratio is roughly 16:1, with an average class size of 20 students. The university has nearly 510 staff members and 278 full-time faculty members in addition to part-time and adjunct professors. Of full-time faculty, 84.9% hold the highest degree in their field.

=== Notable faculty ===
- Henry C. Lee (retired, former professor of forensic science) – worked on famous cases such as the JonBenét Ramsey murder, the O. J. Simpson and Laci Peterson cases, the post-9/11 forensic investigation, the Beltway sniper shootings, and the reinvestigation of the assassination of John F. Kennedy
- Nikodem Popławski (professor of physics) - mostly known for the hypothesis that every black hole could be a doorway to another universe and that the universe was formed within a black hole, which itself exists in a larger universe
- Horatio Strother (former assistant professor of history) - author of a book on the Underground Railroad in Connecticut

== Notable commencement honorees ==
Pet celebrity and dog influencer Doug the Pug was recognized at the University of New Haven's 2025 commencement, being awarded an honorary degree in "Furensic Science."
