= History of the telephone =

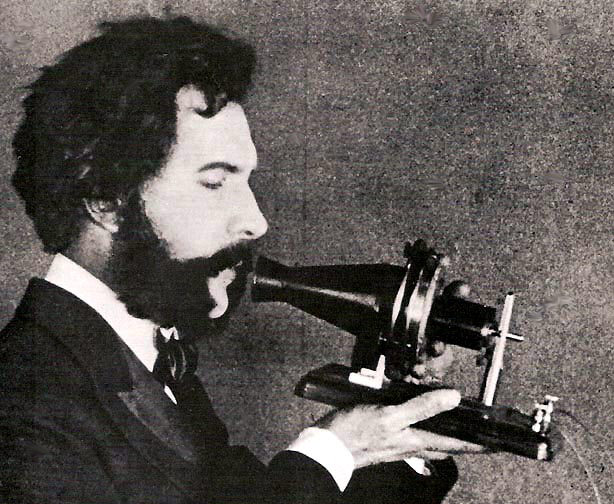
Actor portraying Alexander Graham Bell in a 1932 silent film. Shows Bell's second telephone transmitter (microphone), invented 1876 and first displayed at the Centennial Exposition, Philadelphia.

This history of the telephone chronicles the development of the electrical telephone, and includes a brief overview of its predecessors. The first telephone patent was granted to Alexander Graham Bell in 1876.

== Mechanical acoustic ==
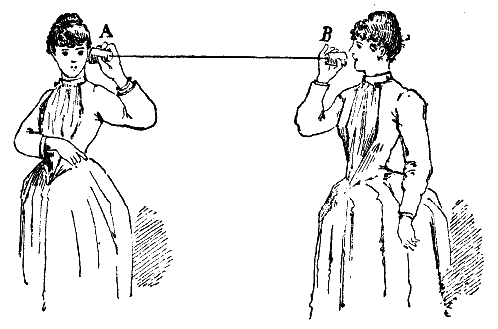
A 19th-century acoustic tin can or "lovers' telephone"

Before the invention of electromagnetic telephones, mechanical acoustic devices existed for transmitting speech and music over a greater distance. This distance was greater than that of normal direct speech. The earliest mechanical telephones were based on sound transmission through pipes or other physical media. The acoustic tin can telephone, or "lovers' phone", has been known for centuries.

Some of the earliest known experiments were conducted by the British physicist and polymath, Robert Hooke, from 1664 to 1685. An acoustic string phone made in 1667 has been attributed to him. An early version was also found in use by the Chimu in Peru. The gourd and stretched-hide version resides in the Smithsonian Museum collection and dates back to around the 7th century AD.

For a few years in the late 1800s, acoustic telephones were marketed commercially as a competitor to the electrical telephone. When the Bell telephone patents expired and many new telephone manufacturers began competing, acoustic telephone makers quickly went out of business. Their maximum range was very limited. An example of one such company was the Pulsion Telephone Supply Company created by Lemuel Mellett in Massachusetts, which designed its version in 1888 and deployed it on railroad right-of-ways.

Additionally, speaking tubes have long been common, especially within buildings and aboard ships, and they are still in use today.

== Electrical devices ==
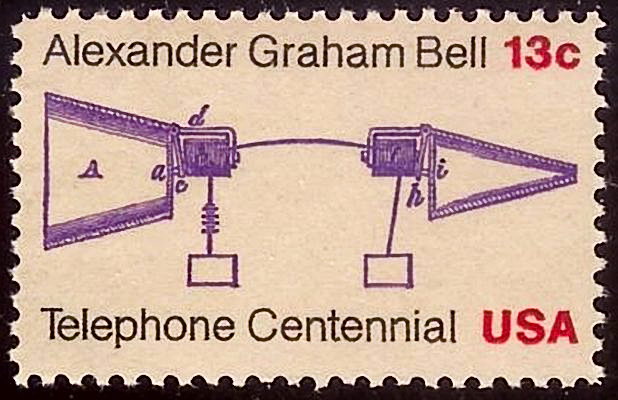
Bell prototype telephone stamp Centennial Issue of 1976

The telephone emerged from the making and successive improvements of the electrical telegraph. In 1804, Spanish polymath and scientist Francisco Salva Campillo constructed an electrochemical telegraph. The first working telegraph was built by the English inventor Francis Ronalds in 1816 and used static electricity. An electromagnetic telegraph was created by Baron Schilling in 1832. Carl Friedrich Gauss and Wilhelm Weber built another electromagnetic telegraph in 1833 in Göttingen. At the University of Göttingen, the two had been working together in the field of magnetism. They built the first telegraph to connect the observatory and the Institute of physics, which was able to send eight words per minute.

The electrical telegraph was first commercialized by Sir William Fothergill Cooke and entered use on the Great Western Railway in England. It ran for 13 mi (21 km) from Paddington station to West Drayton and came into operation on April 9, 1839.

Another electrical telegraph was independently developed and patented in the United States in 1837 by Samuel Morse. His assistant, Alfred Vail, developed the Morse code signaling alphabet with Morse. America's first telegraph was sent by Morse on January 6, 1838, across 2 miles (3 km) of wiring.

== Invention of the telephone ==
Credit for the invention of the electric telephone is frequently disputed, and new controversies over the issue have arisen from time to time. Antonio Meucci, Philipp Reis, Alexander Graham Bell, and Elisha Gray amongst others, have all been credited with the telephone's invention. The early history of the telephone became and still remains a confusing morass of claims and counterclaims, which were not clarified by the huge number of lawsuits filed in order to resolve the patent claims of the many individuals and commercial competitors. The Bell and Edison patents, however, were commercially decisive, because they dominated telephone technology and were upheld by court decisions in the United States.

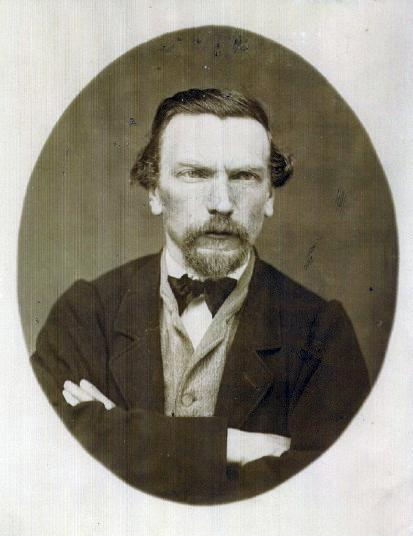
Innocenzo Manzetti considered the idea of a telephone in 1844

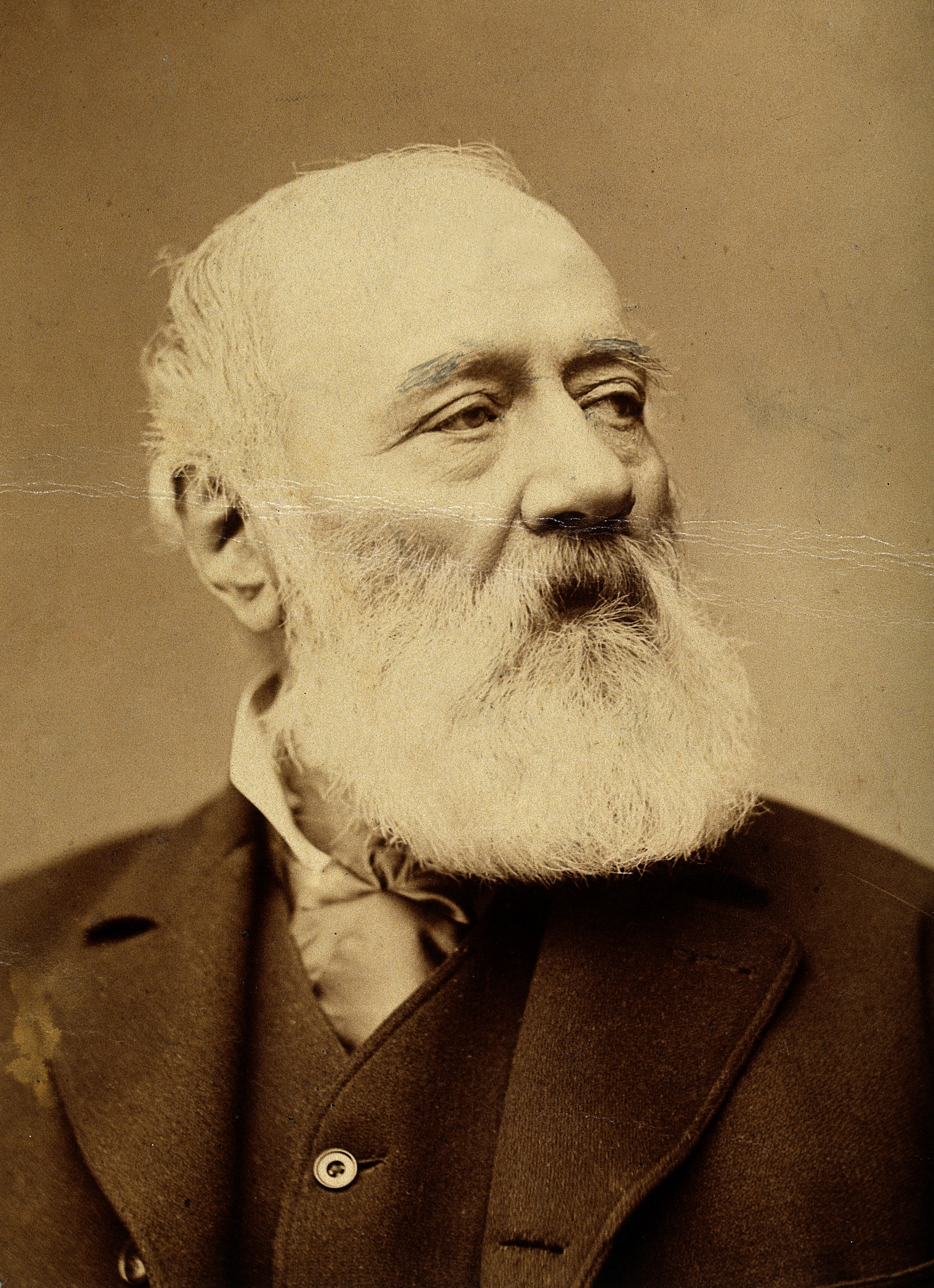
Antonio Meucci, 1849, developing a voice-communication apparatus that several sources credit as the first telephone.

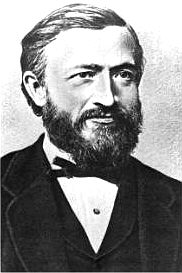
Philipp Reis, 1861, constructed the first telephone, today called the Reis telephone.

Alexander Graham Bell was awarded the first U.S. patent for the invention of the telephone in 1876.

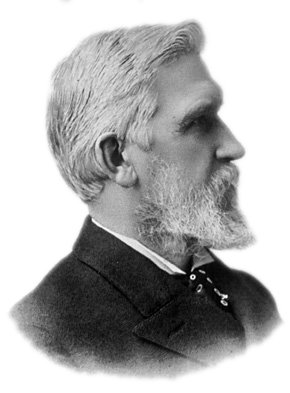
Elisha Gray, 1876, designed a telephone using a water microphone in Highland Park, Illinois.

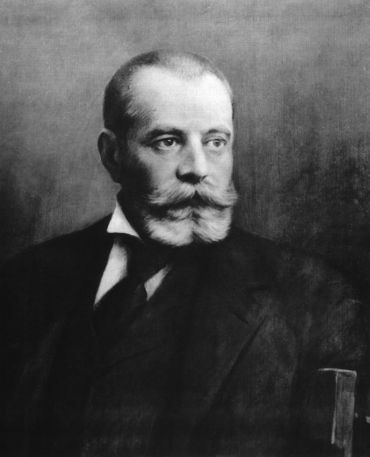
Tivadar Puskás proposed the telephone switchboard exchange in 1876.

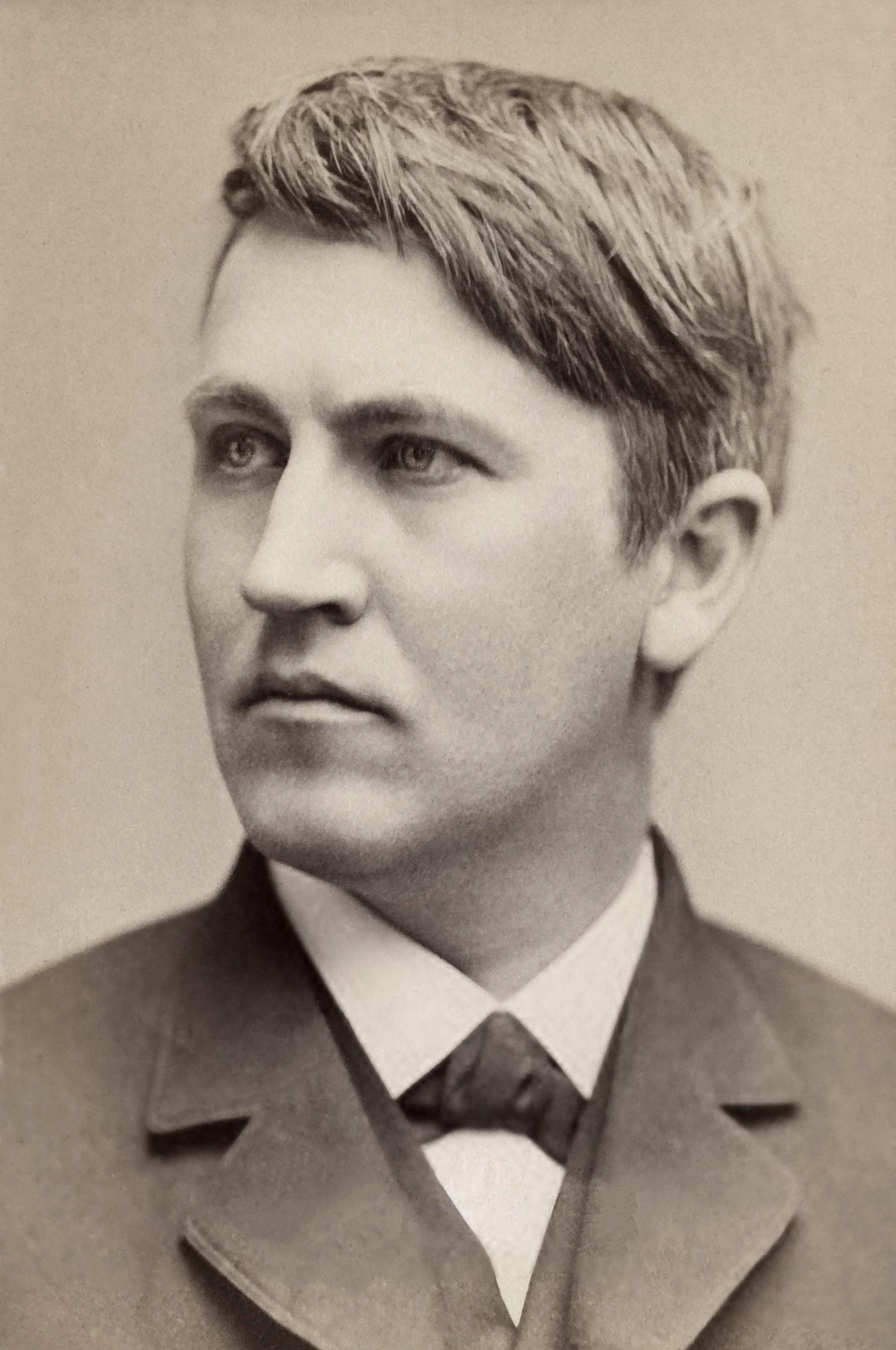
Thomas Edison invented the carbon microphone which produced a strong telephone signal.

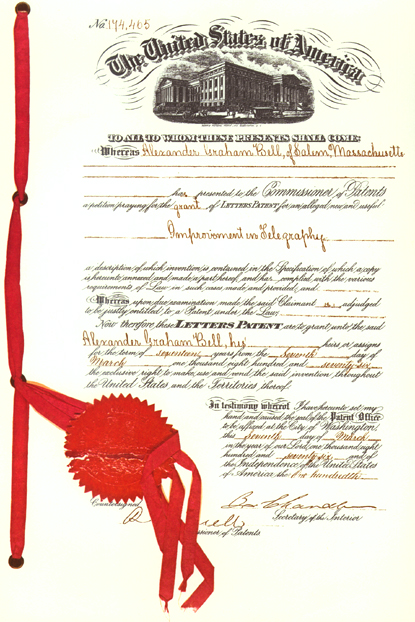
The master telephone patent granted to Bell, 174465, March 7, 1876

The modern telephone is the result of the work of many people. Alexander Graham Bell was, however, the first to patent the telephone, as an "apparatus for transmitting vocal or other sounds telegraphically". Bell has most often been credited as the inventor of the first practical telephone. Johann Philipp Reis coined the term "telephon". Models of it were sent abroad, to London, Dublin, Tiflis, and other places. It became a subject for popular lectures, and an article for scientific cabinets. Edison credited him as the "first inventor of the telephone". The Italian inventor and businessman Antonio Meucci has been recognized by the U.S. House of Representatives for his contributory work on the telephone. Several other controversies also surround the question of priority of invention for the telephone.

The Elisha Gray and Alexander Bell telephone controversy considers the question of whether Bell and Gray invented the telephone independently and, if not, whether Bell stole the invention from Gray. This controversy is narrower than the broader question of who deserves credit for inventing the telephone, for which there are several claimants.

The Canadian Parliamentary Motion on Alexander Graham Bell article reviews the controversial June 2002 United States House of Representatives resolution recognizing Meucci's contributions 'in' the invention of the telephone (not 'for' the invention of the telephone). The same resolution was not passed in the U.S. Senate, thus labeling the House resolution as "political rhetoric". A subsequent counter-motion was unanimously passed in Canada's Parliament 10 days later which declared Bell its inventor. This webpage examines critical aspects of both the parliamentary motion and the congressional resolution.

=== Telephone exchange ===
The main users of the electrical telegraph were post offices, railway stations, the more important governmental centers (ministries), stock exchanges, very few nationally distributed newspapers, the largest internationally important corporations, and wealthy individuals.

Telegraph exchanges worked mainly on a store and forward basis. Although telephonic devices were in use before the invention of the telephone exchange, their success and economical operation would have been impossible with the schema and structure of the contemporary telegraph systems.

Prior to the invention of the telephone switchboard, pairs of telephones were connected directly with each other, which was primarily useful for connecting a home to the owner's business, thereby practically functioning as a primitive intercom. A telephone exchange provides telephone service for a small area. Either manually by operators, or automatically by machine switching equipment, it interconnects individual subscriber lines for calls made between them. This made it possible for subscribers to call each other at homes, businesses, or public spaces. These made telephones an available and comfortable communication tool for many purposes, and it gave the impetus for the creation of a new industrial sector.

The telephone exchange was an idea of the Hungarian engineer Tivadar Puskás (1844–1893) in 1876, while he was working for Thomas Edison on a telegraph exchange. The first commercial telephone exchange was opened at New Haven, Connecticut, with 21 subscribers on 28 January 1878, in a storefront of the Boardman Building in New Haven, Connecticut. George W. Coy designed and built the world's first switchboard for commercial use. Coy was inspired by Alexander Graham Bell's lecture at the Skiff Opera House in New Haven on 27 April 1877.

In Bell's lecture, during which a three-way telephone connection with Hartford and Middletown, Connecticut, was demonstrated, he first discussed the idea of a telephone exchange for the conduct of business and trade. On 3 November 1877, Coy applied for and received a franchise from the Bell Telephone Company for New Haven and Middlesex Counties. Coy, along with Herrick P. Frost and Walter Lewis, who provided the capital, established the District Telephone Company of New Haven on 15 January 1878.

The switchboard built by Coy was, according to one source, constructed of "carriage bolts, handles from teapot lids and bustle wire." According to the company records, all the furnishings of the office, including the switchboard, were worth less than forty dollars. While the switchboard could connect as many as sixty-four customers, only two conversations could be handled simultaneously and six connections had to be made for each call.

The District Telephone Company of New Haven went into operation with only twenty-one subscribers, who paid $1.50 per month. By 21 February 1878, however, when the first telephone directory was published by the company, fifty subscribers were listed. Most of these were businesses and listings such as physicians, the police, and the post office; only eleven residences were listed, four of which were for persons associated with the company.

The New Haven District Telephone Company grew quickly and was reorganized several times in its first years. By 1880, the company had the right from the Bell Telephone Company to service all of Connecticut and western Massachusetts. As it expanded, the company was first renamed Connecticut Telephone, and then Southern New England Telephone in 1882. The site of the first telephone exchange was granted a designation as a National Historic Landmark on 23 April 1965. However it was withdrawn in 1973 in order to demolish the building and construct a parking garage.

== Early telephone developments ==
The following is a brief summary of the history of the development of the telephone:

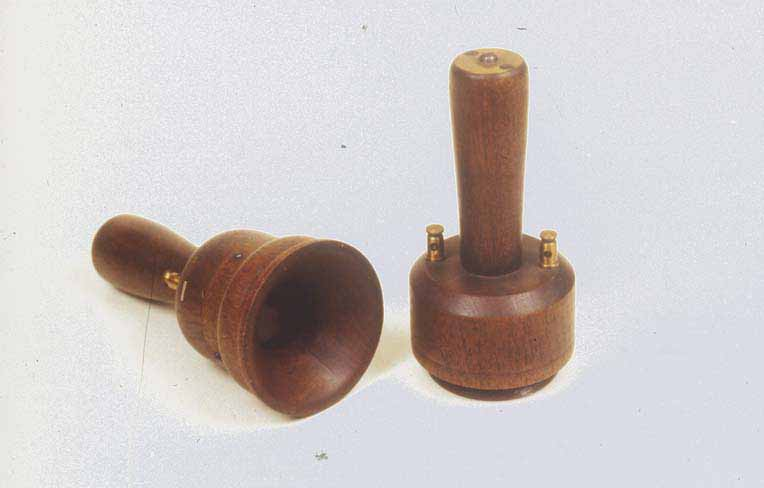
Replica of the telettrofono at Museo Nazionale Scienza e Tecnologia Leonardo da Vinci of Milan, Italy, invented by Antonio Meucci and credited by several sources as the first telephone.

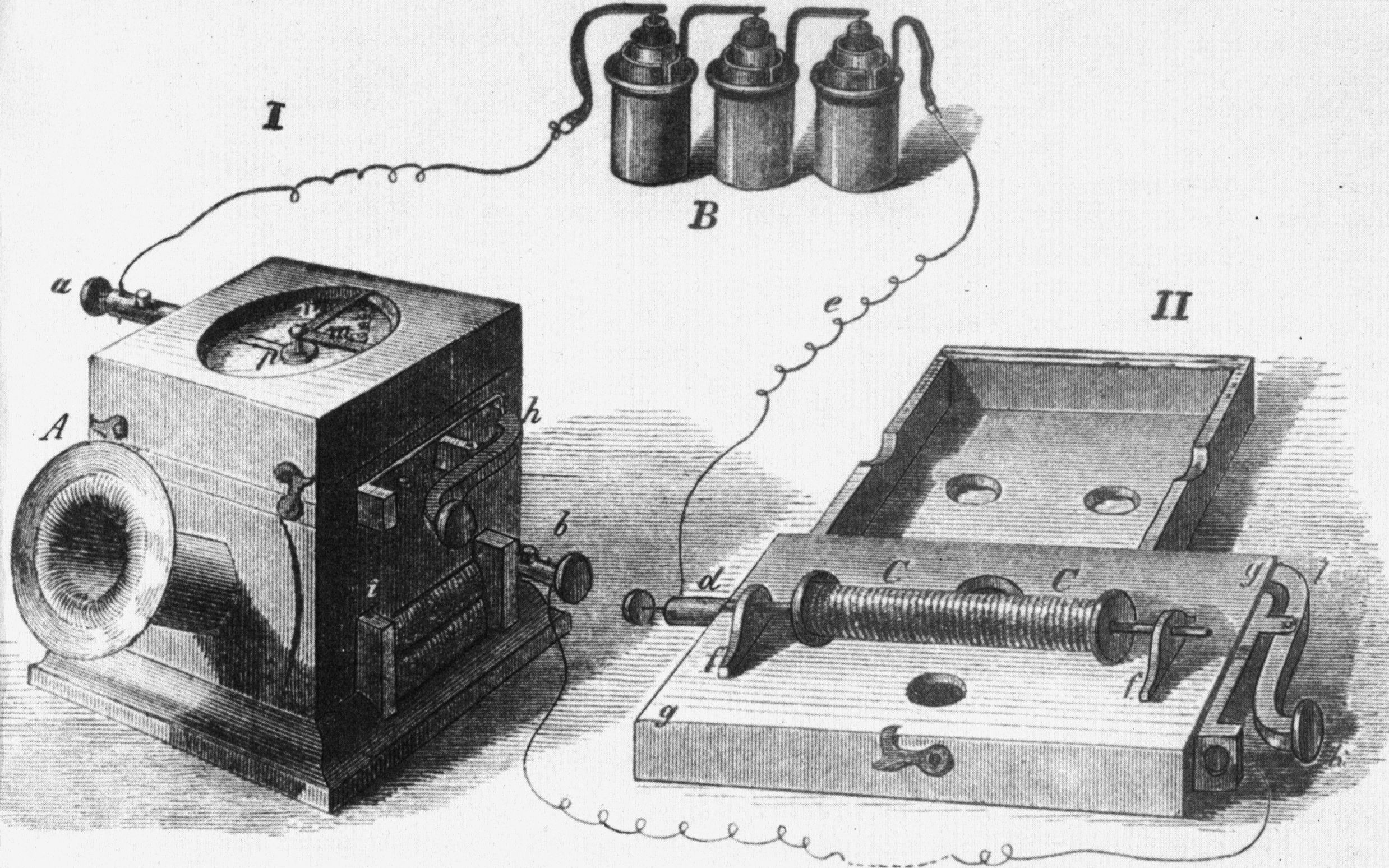
Reis's telephone around 1861, first device called telephone

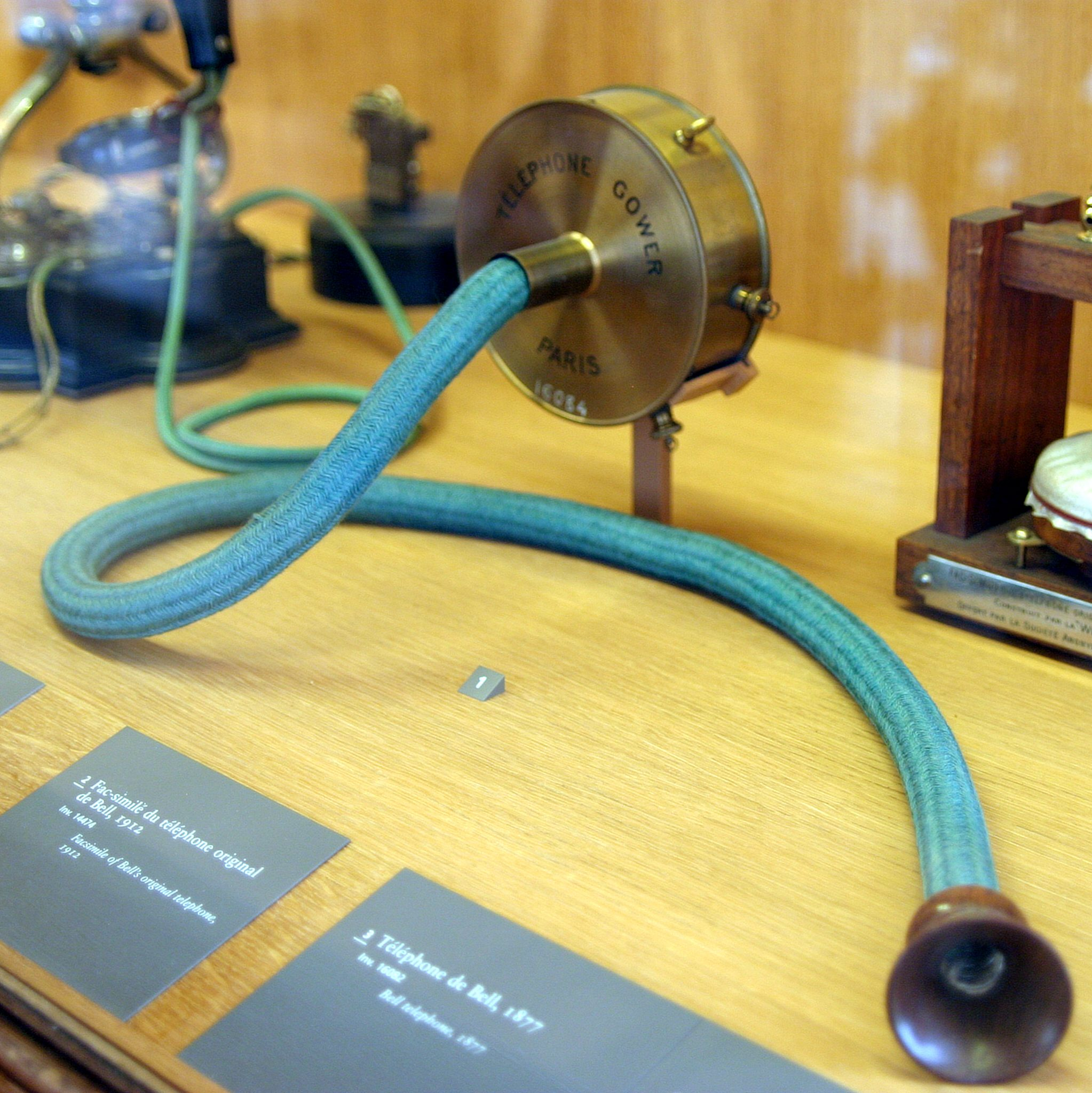
A French Gower telephone of 1912 at the Musée des Arts et Métiers in Paris

- Early 7th century AD - Chimu culture in Peru invents a string telephone using gourds and stretched hide. The original artifact is in the Smithsonian's National Museum of the American Indian storage facility in Suitland, Maryland.
- 1667: Robert Hooke invents a string telephone that conveys sounds over an extended wire by mechanical vibrations. It was to be termed an 'acoustic' or 'mechanical' (non-electrical) telephone.
- 1753: Charles Morrison proposes the idea that electricity can be used to transmit messages, by using different wires for each letter.
- 1844: Innocenzo Manzetti first moots the idea of a "speaking telegraph" (telephone).
- 1849: Antonio Meucci developed a voice-communication apparatus that several sources credit as the first telephone.
- 1854: Charles Bourseul writes a memorandum on the principles of the telephone. (See the article: "Transmission électrique de la parole", L'Illustration, Paris, 26 August 1854.)
- 2 June 1854: Antonio Meucci demonstrates an electric voice-operated device in New York; exactly what kind of device he demonstrates is unknown.
- 1861: Philipp Reis constructs the first speech-transmitting telephone
- 28 December 1871: Antonio Meucci files a patent caveat (No. 3353, a notice of intent to invent, but not a formal patent application) at the U.S. Patent Office for a device he names a "Sound Telegraph".
- 1872: Elisha Gray establishes Western Electric Manufacturing Company.
- 1 July 1875: Bell uses a bi-directional "gallows" telephone that is able to transmit "voicelike sounds", but not clear speech. Both the transmitter and the receiver are identical membrane electromagnet instruments.
- 1875: Thomas Edison experiments with acoustic telegraphy and in November builds an electro-dynamic receiver, but does not exploit it.
- 1875: Hungarian Tivadar Puskás (the inventor of the telephone exchange) arrives in the USA.
- 6 April 1875: Bell's U.S. Patent 161,739 "Transmitters and Receivers for Electric Telegraphs" is granted. This uses multiple vibrating steel reeds in make-break circuits, and the concept of multiplexed frequencies.
- 20 January 1876: Bell signs and notarizes his patent application for the telephone.
- 11 February 1876: Elisha Gray designs a liquid transmitter for use with a telephone, but does not build one.
- 7 March 1876: Bell's U.S. patent No. 174,465 for the telephone is granted.
- 10 March 1876: Bell transmits the sentence: "Mr. Watson, come here! I want to see you!" using a liquid transmitter and an electromagnetic receiver.
- 10 August 1876: Using the telegraph line between Brantford and Paris, Ontario, eight miles (thirteen kilometres) distant, Bell makes a telephone call, said by some to be the "world's first long-distance call".
- 30 January 1877: Bell's U.S. patent No. 186,787 is granted for an electromagnetic telephone using permanent magnets, iron diaphragms, and a call bell.
- 27 April 1877: Edison files for a patent on a carbon (graphite) transmitter. Patent No. 474,230 is granted on 3 May 1892, after a 15-year delay because of litigation. Edison is later granted patent No. 222,390 for a carbon granules transmitter in 1879.
- 6 October 1877: Scientific American publishes the invention from Bell—at that time still without a ringer.
- 25 October 1877: the article in Scientific American is discussed at the Telegraphenamt in Berlin
- 12 November 1877: The first commercial telephone company enters telephone business in Friedrichsberg close to Berlin using the Siemens pipe as ringer and telephone devices built by Siemens.
- 1877: The first experimental Telephone Exchange is established in Boston.
- 1877: First long-distance telephone line
- 1877: Emile Berliner invents an improved telephone transmitter.
- 14 January 1878: Bell demonstrates the telephone to Queen Victoria and makes the first publicly witnessed long-distance calls in the UK. The queen tries the device and finds it to be "quite extraordinary".
- 26 January 1878: The first permanent telephone connection in the UK is made between two businesses in Manchester
- 28 January 1878: The first commercial US telephone exchange opens in New Haven, Connecticut.
- 15 June 1878: The first commercial toll line enters operation, connecting Springfield and Holyoke, Massachusetts
- 1887: Tivadar Puskás introduces the multiplex switchboard, that has an epochal significance in the further development of telephone exchanges.
- 1915: The first U.S. coast-to-coast long-distance telephone call, is ceremonially inaugurated by A.G. Bell in New York City and Bell's former assistant Thomas Augustus Watson in San Francisco, California.
- 1927: The first transatlantic phone call is made, from the United States to the United Kingdom.

== Early commercial instruments ==
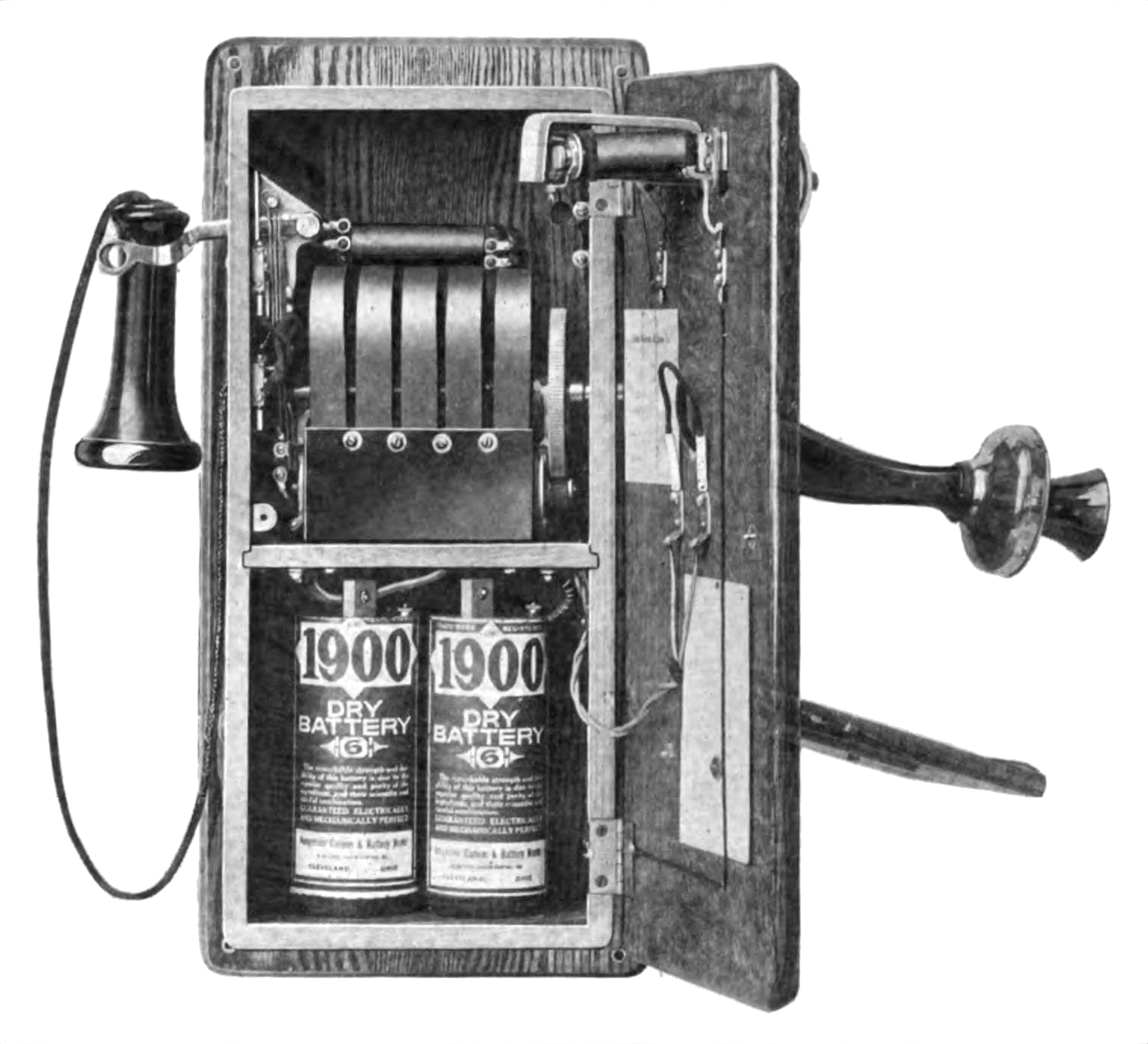
1917 wall telephone, open to show magneto and local battery

Early telephones were technically diverse. Some of them used liquid transmitters which soon went out of use. Others were dynamic: their diaphragms vibrated a coil of wire in the field of a permanent magnet or vice versa. Such sound-powered telephones survived in small numbers through the 20th century in military and maritime applications where the ability to create its own electrical power was crucial. Most, however, used Edison/Berliner carbon transmitters, which were much louder than the other kinds, even though they required induction coils, actually acting as impedance matching transformers to make it compatible to the line impedance. The Edison patents kept the Bell monopoly viable into the 20th century, by which time telephone networks were more important than the instrument.

Early telephones were locally powered by a dynamic transmitter. One of the jobs of outside plant personnel was to visit each telephone periodically to inspect the battery. During the 20th century, the "common battery" operation came to dominate, and was powered by the "talk battery" from the telephone exchange over the same wires that carried the voice signals. Late in the century, wireless handsets brought a revival of local battery power.

The earliest telephones had only one wire for transmitting and receiving of audio, and used a ground return path. The earliest dynamic telephones also had only one opening for sound, and the user listened and spoke into the same hole. Sometimes the instruments were operated in pairs at each end, making conversation more convenient but also more expensive.

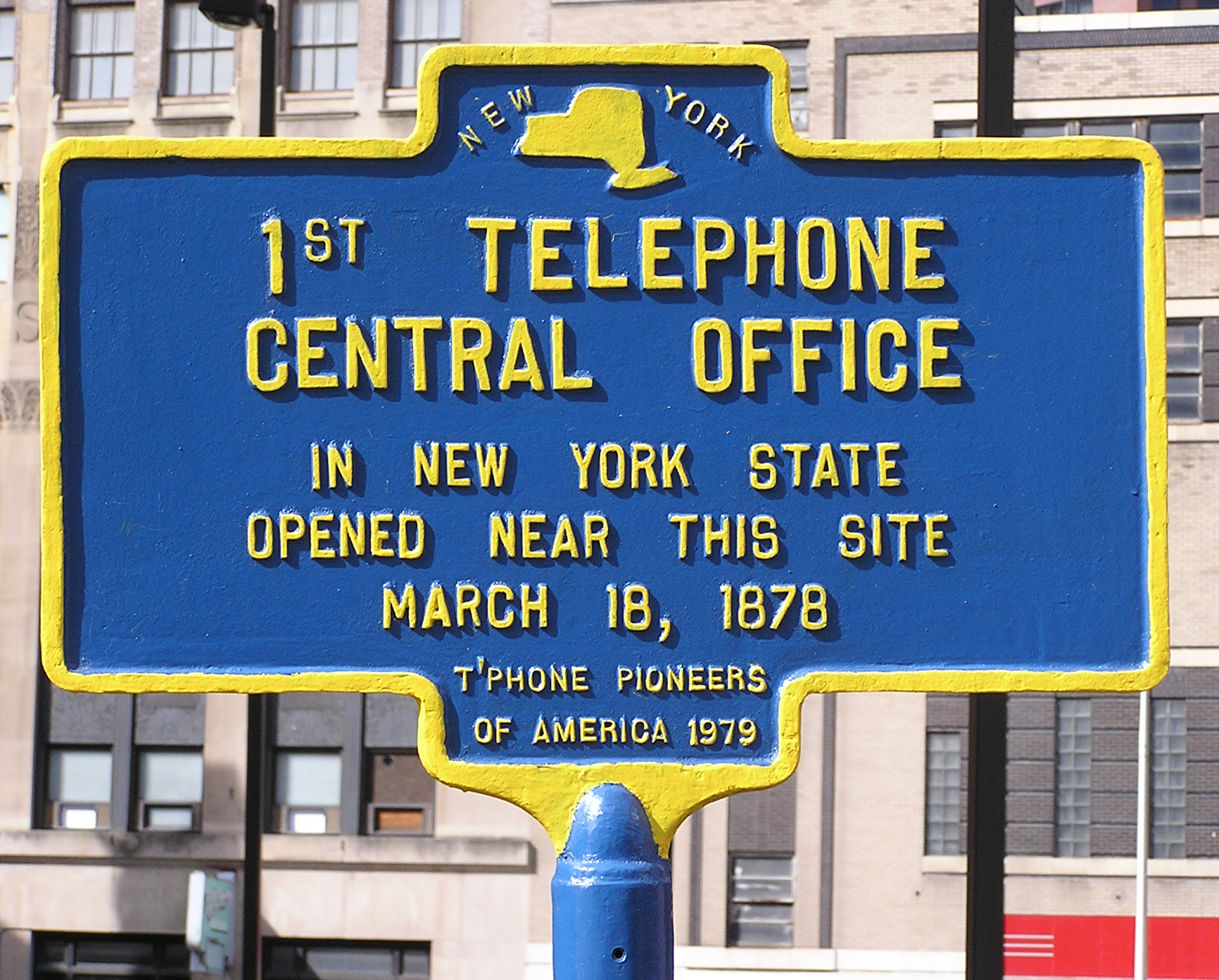
Historical marker commemorating the first telephone central office in New York State (1878)

At first, telephones were leased in pairs to the subscriber, for example one for his home and one for his shop, and the subscriber had to arrange with telegraph contractors to construct a line between them. Users who wanted the ability to speak to three or four different shops, suppliers etc. would obtain and set up three or four pairs of telephones. Western Union, already using telegraph exchanges, quickly extended the principle to its telephones in New York City and San Francisco, and Bell was not slow in appreciating the potential.

Signaling began in an appropriately primitive manner. The user alerted the other end, or the exchange operator, by whistling into the transmitter. Exchange operation soon resulted in telephones being equipped with a bell, first operated over a second wire and later with the same wire using a condenser. Telephones connected to the earliest Strowger automatic exchanges had seven wires, one for the knife switch, one for each telegraph key, one for the bell, one for the push button and two for speaking.

Rural and other telephones that were not on a common battery exchange had hand cranked "magneto" generators to produce an alternating current to ring the bells of other telephones on the line and to alert the exchange operator.

In 1877 and 1878, Edison invented and developed the carbon microphone used in all telephones along with the Bell receiver until the 1980s. After protracted patent litigation, a federal court ruled in 1892 that Edison and not Emile Berliner was the inventor of the carbon microphone. The carbon microphone was also used in radio broadcasting and public address work through the 1920s.

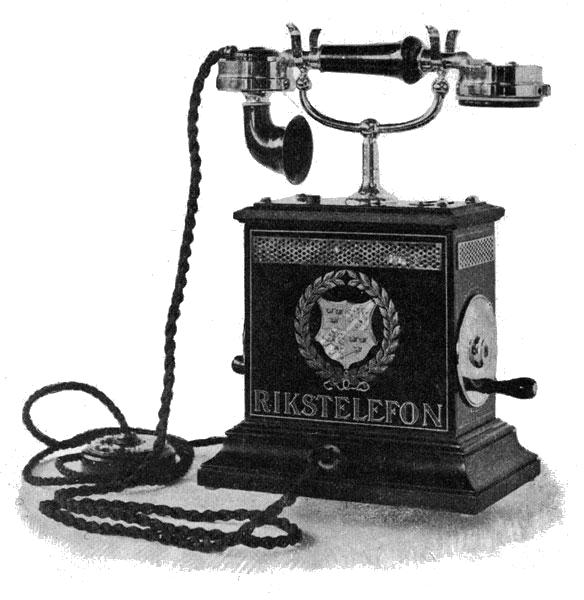
1896 telephone (Sweden)

In the 1890s a new smaller style of telephone was introduced, the candlestick telephone, and it was packaged in three parts. The transmitter stood on a stand, known as a "candlestick" for its shape. When not in use, the receiver hung on a hook with a switch in it, known as a "switchhook". Previous telephones required the user to operate a separate switch to connect either the voice or the bell. With the new kind, the user was less likely to leave the phone "off the hook". In phones connected to magneto exchanges, the bell, induction coil, battery, and magneto were in a separate bell box called a "ringer box". In phones connected to common battery exchanges, the ringer box was installed under a desk, or other out of the way place, since it did not need a battery or magneto.

Cradle designs were also used at this time, with a handle with the receiver and transmitter attached, separate from the cradle base that housed the magneto crank and other parts. They were larger than the "candlestick" and more popular.

Disadvantages of single-wire operation, such as crosstalk and hum from nearby AC power wires, had already led to the use of twisted pairs and, for long-distance telephones, four-wire circuits. Users at the beginning of the 20th century did not place long-distance calls from their own telephones but made an appointment to use a special sound-proofed long-distance telephone booth furnished with the latest technology.

Around 1893, the country leading the world in telephones per 100 persons—known as teledensity—was Sweden with 0.55 in the whole country but 4 in Stockholm (10,000 out of a total of 27,658 subscribers). This compares with 0.4 in the US for that year. Telephone service in Sweden developed through a variety of institutional forms: the International Bell Telephone Company (a U.S. multinational), town and village co-operatives, the General Telephone Company of Stockholm (a Swedish private company), and the Swedish Telegraph Department (part of the Swedish government). Since Stockholm consists of islands, telephone service offered relatively large advantages, but had to use submarine cables extensively. Competition between Bell Telephone and General Telephone, and later between General Telephone and the Swedish Telegraph Dept., was intense.

In 1893, the U.S. was considerably behind Sweden, New Zealand, Switzerland, and Norway in teledensity. The U.S. became the world leadership in teledensity with the rise of many independent telephone companies after the Bell patents expired in 1893 and 1894.

== 20th-century developments ==
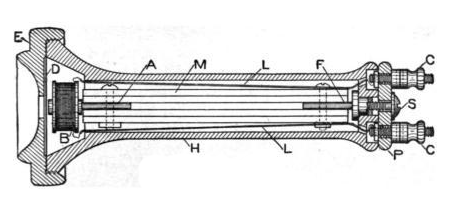
Receiver schematic, c.1906

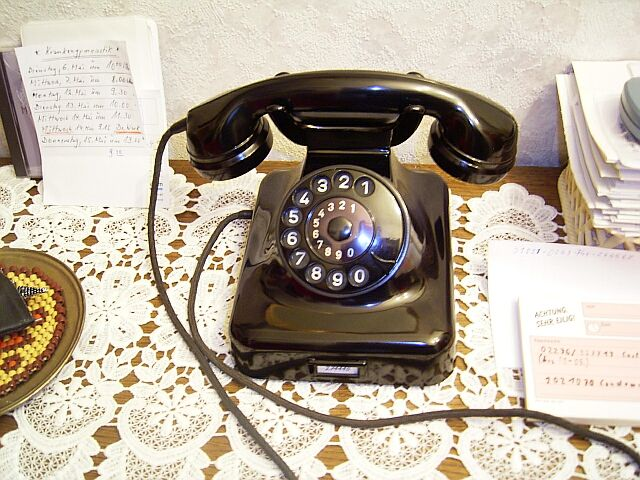
A German rotary dial telephone, the W48

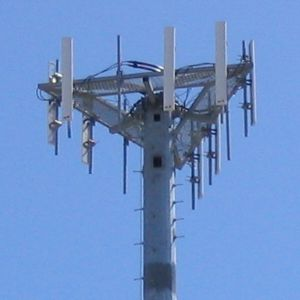
Top of cellular telephone tower

By 1904, over three million phones were connected by manual switchboard exchanges in the U.S. By 1914, the U.S. was the world leader in telephone density and had more than twice the teledensity of Sweden, New Zealand, Switzerland, and Norway. The relatively good performance of the U.S. occurred despite competing telephone networks not interconnecting. On January 7, 1927, W. S. Gifford, president of the American Telephone & Telegraph Company, called Evelyn P. Murray to test the first commercial telephone line across the Atlantic Ocean.

What turned out to be the most popular and longest-lasting physical style of telephone was introduced in the early 20th century, including Bell's model 102 telephone. A carbon granule transmitter and electromagnetic receiver were united in a single molded plastic handle, which when not in use were placed in a cradle in the base unit. The circuit diagram of the model 102 shows the direct connection of the receiver to the line, while the transmitter was induction coupled, with energy supplied by a local battery. The coupling transformer, battery, and ringer were in a separate enclosure from the desk set. The rotary dial in the base interrupted the line current by repeatedly but very briefly disconnecting the line 1 to 10 times for each digit, and the hook switch (in the center of the circuit diagram) permanently disconnected the line and the transmitter battery while the handset was on the cradle.

Starting in the 1930s, the base of the telephone also enclosed its bell and induction coil, obviating the need for a separate ringer box. Power was supplied to each subscriber line by central-office batteries instead of the user's local battery, which required periodic service. For the next half century, the network behind the telephone grew progressively larger and much more efficient, and, after the rotary dial was added, the instrument itself changed little until Touch-Tone signaling started replacing the rotary dial in the 1960s.

The history of mobile phones can be traced back to two-way radios permanently installed in vehicles such as taxicabs, police cruisers, railroad trains, and the like. Later versions such as the so-called transportables or "bag phones" were equipped with a cigarette-lighter plug so that they could also be carried, and thus could be used as either mobile two-way radios or as portable phones by being patched into the telephone network.

In December 1947, Bell Labs engineers Douglas H. Ring and W. Rae Young proposed hexagonal cell transmissions for mobile phones. Philip T. Porter, also of Bell Labs, proposed that the cell towers be at the corners of the hexagons rather than the centers and have directional antennas that would transmit/receive in 3 directions (see picture at right) into 3 adjacent hexagon cells. The technology did not exist then and the radio frequencies had not yet been allocated. Cellular technology was undeveloped until the 1960s, when Richard H. Frenkiel and Joel S. Engel of Bell Labs developed the electronics.

Meanwhile, the 1956 inauguration of the TAT-1 cable and later international direct dialing were important steps in putting together the various continental telephone networks into a global network.

On 3 April 1973, Motorola manager Martin Cooper placed a cellular-phone call (in front of reporters) to Dr. Joel S. Engel, head of research at AT&T's Bell Labs. This began the era of the handheld cellular-mobile phone.

Cable-television companies began to use their fast-developing cable networks with ducting under the streets of the United Kingdom in the late 1980s to provide telephony services in association with major telephone companies. One of the early cable operators in the UK, Cable London, connected its first cable telephone customer in about 1990.

=== Digital telephone technology ===
The rapid development and wide adoption of pulse-code modulation (PCM) digital telephony was enabled by metal–oxide–semiconductor (MOS) technology. The MOS field-effect transistor (MOSFET) was invented by Mohamed M. Atalla and Dawon Kahng at Bell Telephone Laboratories in 1959, and the MOS integrated circuit (MOS IC) chip was proposed soon after, but MOS technology was initially overlooked by Bell because they did not find it practical for analog telephone applications, before it was commercialized by Fairchild and RCA for digital electronics such as computers. MOS technology eventually became practical for telephone applications with the MOS mixed-signal integrated circuit, which combines analog and digital signal processing on a single chip, developed by former Bell engineer David A. Hodges with Paul R. Gray at UC Berkeley in the early 1970s. In 1974, Hodges and Gray worked with R.E. Suarez to develop MOS switched capacitor (SC) circuit technology, which they used to develop the digital-to-analog converter (DAC) chip, using MOSFETs and MOS capacitors for data conversion. This was followed by the analog-to-digital converter (ADC) chip, developed by Gray and J. McCreary in 1975.

MOS SC circuits led to the development of PCM codec-filter chips in the late 1970s. The silicon-gate CMOS (complementary MOS) PCM codec-filter chip, developed by Hodges and W.C. Black in 1980, has since been the industry standard for digital telephony. By the 1990s, telecommunication networks such as the public switched telephone network (PSTN) had been largely digitized with very-large-scale integration (VLSI) CMOS PCM codec-filters, widely used in switching systems for telephone exchanges, private branch exchanges (PBX) and key telephone systems (KTS); user-end modems; data transmission applications such as digital loop carriers, pair gain multiplexers, telephone loop extenders, integrated services digital network (ISDN) terminals, digital cordless telephones and digital cell phones; and applications such as speech recognition equipment, voice data storage, voice mail and digital tapeless answering machines. The bandwidth of digital telecommunication networks has been rapidly increasing at an exponential rate, as observed by Edholm's law, largely driven by the rapid scaling and miniaturization of MOS technology.

The British companies Pye TMC, Marconi-Elliott and GEC developed the digital push-button telephone, based on MOS IC technology, in 1970. It was variously called the "MOS telephone", the "push-button telephone chip", and the "telephone on a chip". It used MOS IC logic, with thousands of MOSFETs on a chip, to convert the keypad input into a pulse signal. This made it possible for push-button telephones to be used with pulse dialing at most telephone exchanges. MOS telephone technology introduced a new feature: the use of MOS memory chips to store phone numbers, which could then be used for speed dialing at the push of a button. This was demonstrated in the United Kingdom by Pye TMC, Marcno-Elliot and GEC in 1970. Between 1971 and 1973, Bell combined MOS technology with touch-tone technology to develop a push-button MOS touch-tone phone called the "Touch-O-Matic" telephone, which could store up to 32 phone numbers. This was made possible by the low cost, low power requirements, small size and high reliability of MOSFETs, over 15,000 of which were contained on ten MOS IC chips, including one chip for logic, one for the keypad dial interface, and eight for memory.

== Women's usage in the 20th century ==
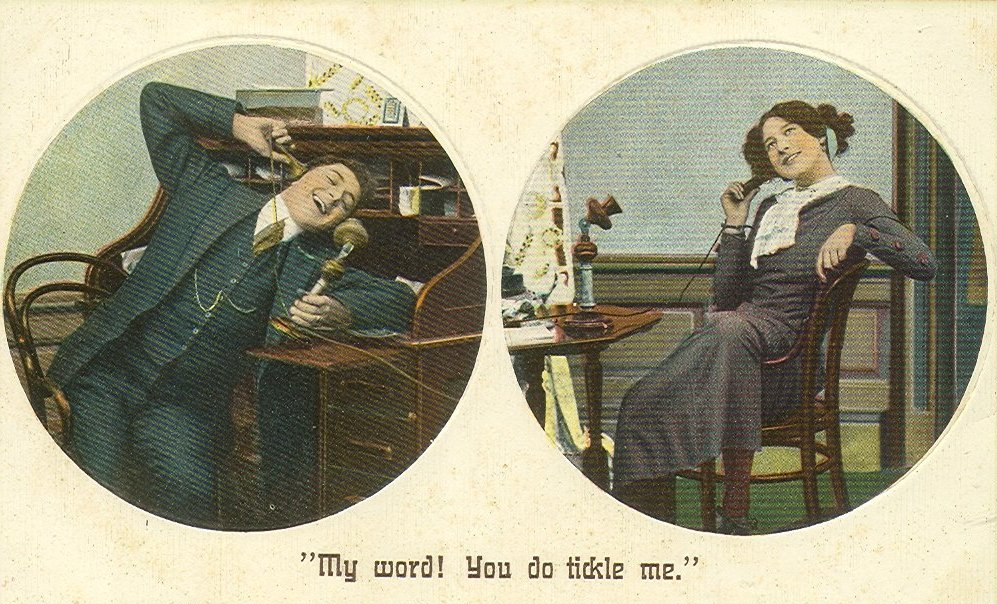
Private conversation, 1910

The telephone was instrumental to modernization. It aided in the development of suburbs and the separation of homes and businesses, but also became a reason for the separation between women occupying the private sphere and men in the public sphere. Both historically and currently, women are predominantly responsible for the telephone calls that bridge the public and private sphere, such as calls regarding doctor's appointments and meetings. This contrasts the role of women historically as the majority of telephone operators. The invention of the telephone introduced job opportunities for women at a time when there were very few available. The operators were often unmarried women who experienced low pay and inhumane working conditions.

== 21st-century developments ==
Internet Protocol (IP) telephony, also known as Internet telephony or Voice over Internet Protocol (VoIP), is a disruptive technology that is rapidly gaining ground against traditional telephone network technologies.

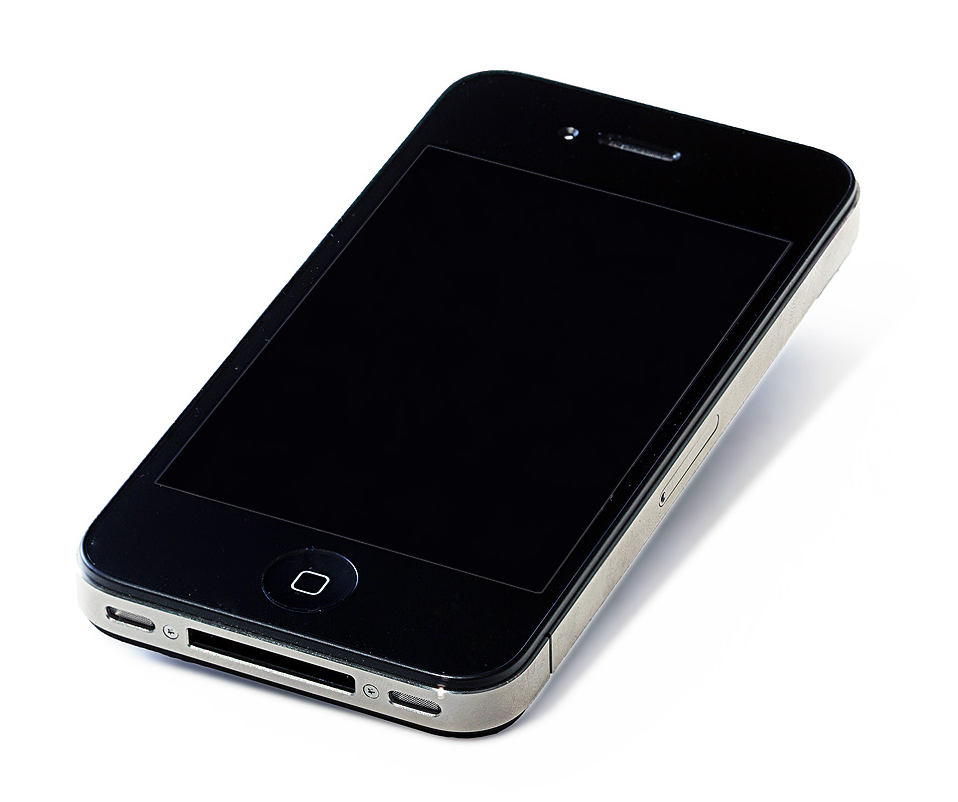
Apple iPhone smartphone

IP telephony uses a broadband Internet service to transmit conversations as data packets. In addition to replacing the traditional plain old telephone service (POTS) systems, IP telephony competes with mobile phone networks by offering free or lower cost service via WiFi hotspots. VoIP is also used on private wireless networks which may or may not have a connection to the outside telephone network.

Telecommunication of the 21st century has been dominated by the development of the smartphone. This is a combination of a hand-held computer, a cellular phone, a digital camera, and Internet access. One of its features is the touch screen that facilitates the primary interaction for users for most tasks, such as dialing telephone numbers. Some of its software features also include email communication, as well as audio and video playback and capture.

== Answering the Telephone ==
Originally, Alexander Graham Bell suggested the word "Ahoy" for answering telephones. But it was Thomas Alva Edison who suggested "Hello" which is still used today. Interestingly, P.G. Wodehouse, a British author showed that at least during the era including 1919 and possibly up until 1931, the British answered the phone by saying, "Are you there?" finding "hello" too abrupt.

== See also ==
- Carbon microphone
- History of mobile phones
- History of telecommunication
- History of videotelephony
- Private branch exchange
- Push-button telephone
- Telephone exchange
- Timeline of the telephone
- Telegraph in United States history
- Telephone in United States history
- Invention of the telephone
  - Bell Telephone Memorial, a major monument dedicated to the invention of the telephone
  - Charles Bourseul – claimed inventor of the telephone
  - Elisha Gray
  - Elisha Gray and Alexander Bell telephone controversy
  - Innocenzo Manzetti
  - Johann Philipp Reis – claimed inventor of the telephone
  - Antonio Meucci – claimed inventor of the telephone
  - The Telephone Cases, a series of court decisions in the U.S. on the telephone's invention
  - Thomas Edison's carbon telephone transmitter – greatly improved the telephone's sound quality
