= W48 (disambiguation) =

The W48 was an American nuclear artillery shell.

W48 may also refer to:

- W48 (telephone)
- Essex Skypark, in Baltimore County, Maryland, United States
- Nayoro Station, in Hokkaido, Japan
