= Speaking tube =

Speech carried through pipes

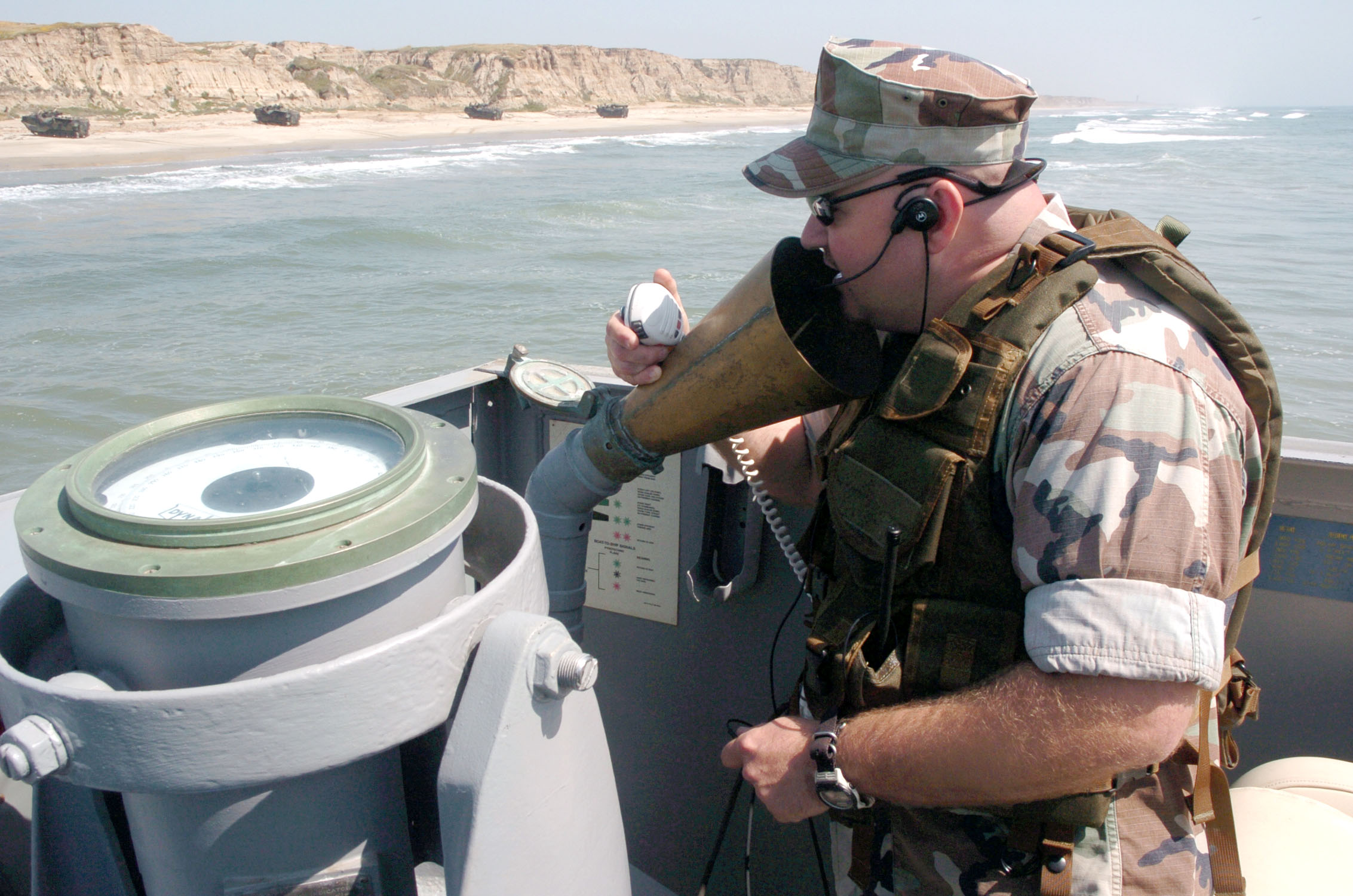
A speaking tube in use on a United States Navy Landing Craft Utility (2005)

A speaking tube or voicepipe is a device based on two cones connected by an air pipe through which speech can be transmitted over an extended distance.

Use of pipes was suggested by Francis Bacon in the New Atlantis (1672). The usage for telecommunications was experimented with and proposed for administrative communications in 1782 by the French monk Dom Gauthey in a memorandum communicated to the Académie des Sciences. Dom Gauthey launched a subscription supported by Benjamin Franklin and other French scientists to finance further experiments, but was not able to raise enough money to go ahead. The British utilitarian philosopher Jeremy Bentham proposed the inclusion of "conversation tubes" in the architecture of his Panopticon (1787, 1791, 1811) and then as a means of military telecommunication (1793) and at the end as a necessary equipment in the architecture of ministries (1825).

While its most common use was in intra-ship communications, the principle was also used in affluent homes and offices of the 19th century, as well as expensive automobiles, military aircraft, and even locomotives. For most purposes, the device was outmoded by the telephone and its widespread adoption.

== Design ==
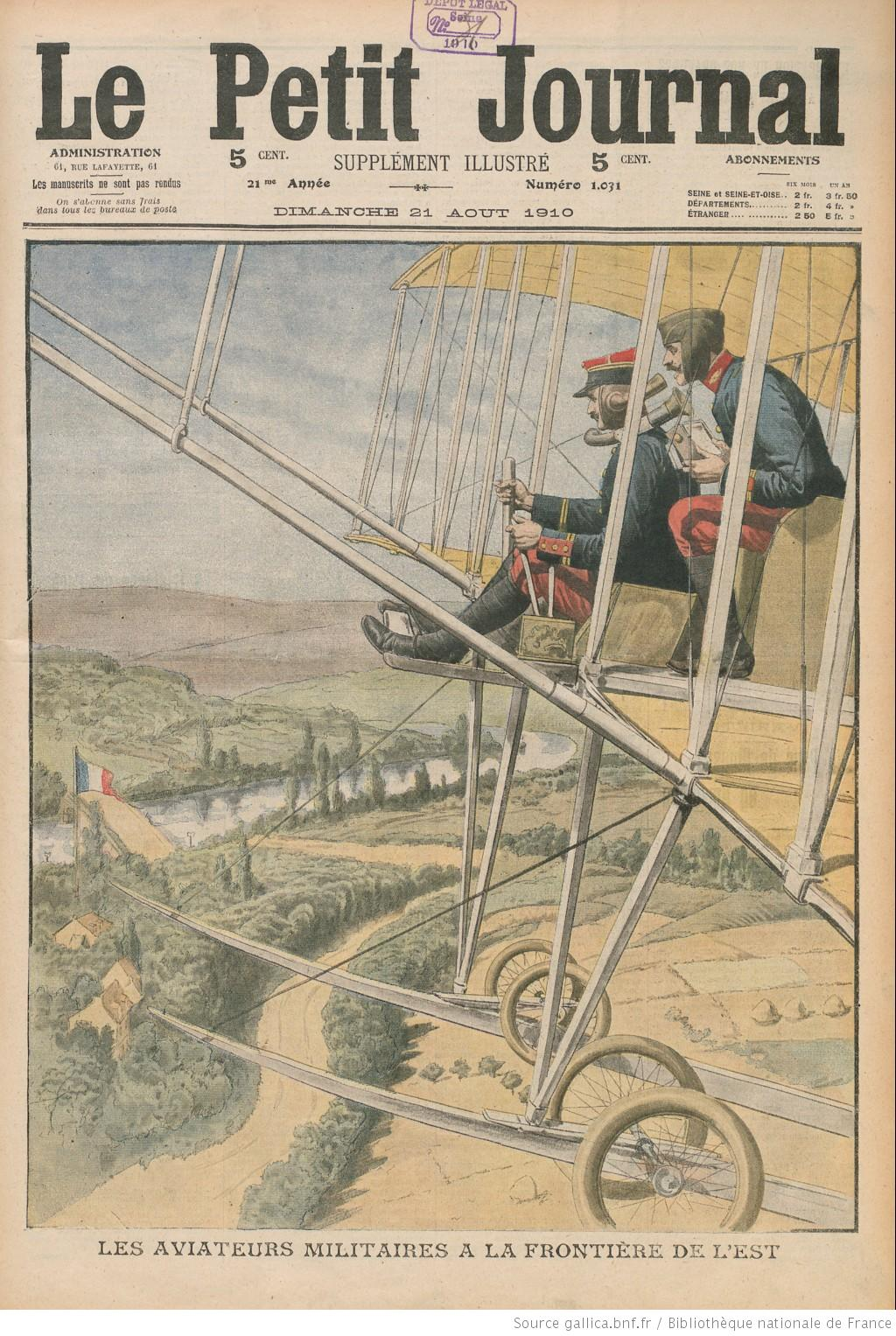
Le Petit Journal, 21 August 1910. French air-force ready to deter hostile advances along the eastern frontier, and equipped with intercom - two speaking tubes for full duplex send and receive.

Early voicepipes consisted of two cones, of wood or metal, one end shaped to fit the speaker's mouth, connected to the other which was flared to amplify the sound (specifically to match the impedance of the tube to that of the open room). Later designs of the voicepipe inserted a removable cork-mounted whistle, which could be sounded by blowing into the tube from the other end. On naval vessels, this created a distinctive sound associated with urgent intra-ship communication. The sound of the whistle would summon the listener, who would remove the whistle and answer the call.

Voice pipes could be used over distances as long as 300 feet (90 m). However, very long speaking tubes might use an electrical signalling device to indicate a call, as the large volume of air in the pipe would make it difficult to blow with enough pressure to sound a whistle at the far end. Despite this, a pipe with a larger internal diameter was desirable for longer runs as the signal loss is inversely proportional to the pipe's cross-sectional area.

Voicepipes have no switching mechanism and so, to provide multiple destinations, separate voicepipes with dedicated transit pipes have to be provided between all pairs of desired endpoints.

The technology continues to be used into the electronic age due to its reliability and low cost. Voice pipes are unaffected by a complete electrical power loss or by an electromagnetic pulse. Warships built as late as the 1950s continued to incorporate voicepipes alongside more advanced technology.

== Maritime use ==
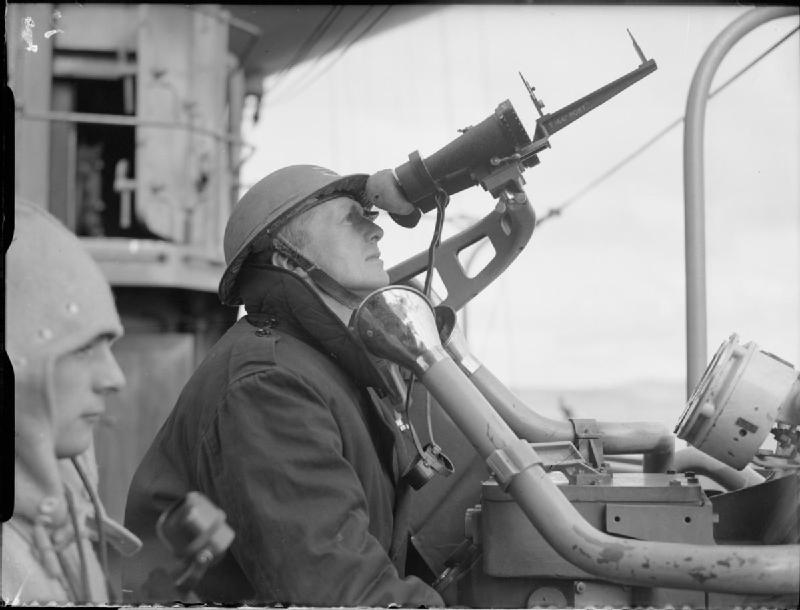
British warship officer with mounted binoculars and two speaking tubes

Voice pipes, the maritime term, served to transmit reports from lookout positions aloft to the deck and from the bridge to the steering position and engine room. These were somewhat larger in diameter than the domestic version and were often covered in sound absorbent material to increase their efficiency.

Copper voice pipes were being fitted to British two and three-deck warships as early as 1803. A notable use was on board HMS Victory at the Battle of Trafalgar in 1805. Victory's ship's wheel was shot away early in the battle. A voice tube was then used to carry steering orders from the quarterdeck down three decks, to where a gang of sailors operated the ship's tiller directly using ropes and pulleys.

One disadvantage of voice pipes is that they may breach the integrity of watertight spaces. This led to the introduction of shut-off valves on both ends of voicepipes to prevent water from a flooded compartment from entering other compartments via its voicepipes.

Permanently fitted, rigid voice pipes are still in use and are generally covered with heavy lids to avoid ingress of water. The speaker has to place their mouth in the "horn" or bell-shaped end of the pipe and the receiver has to "bend an ear" to hear what is being said.

Voice pipes have generally been replaced by sound-powered telephones. The speaking tubes on naval ships are used when they are in "clam" mode instead of telephones for electronic stealth.

== Domestic use ==
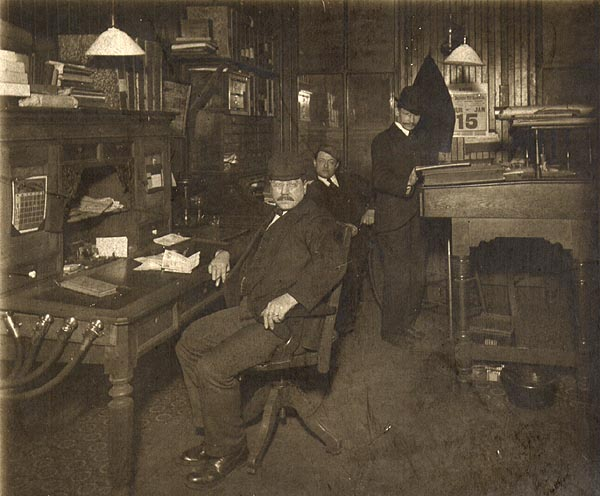
An office in 1903, showing speaking tubes hanging on the end of a desk

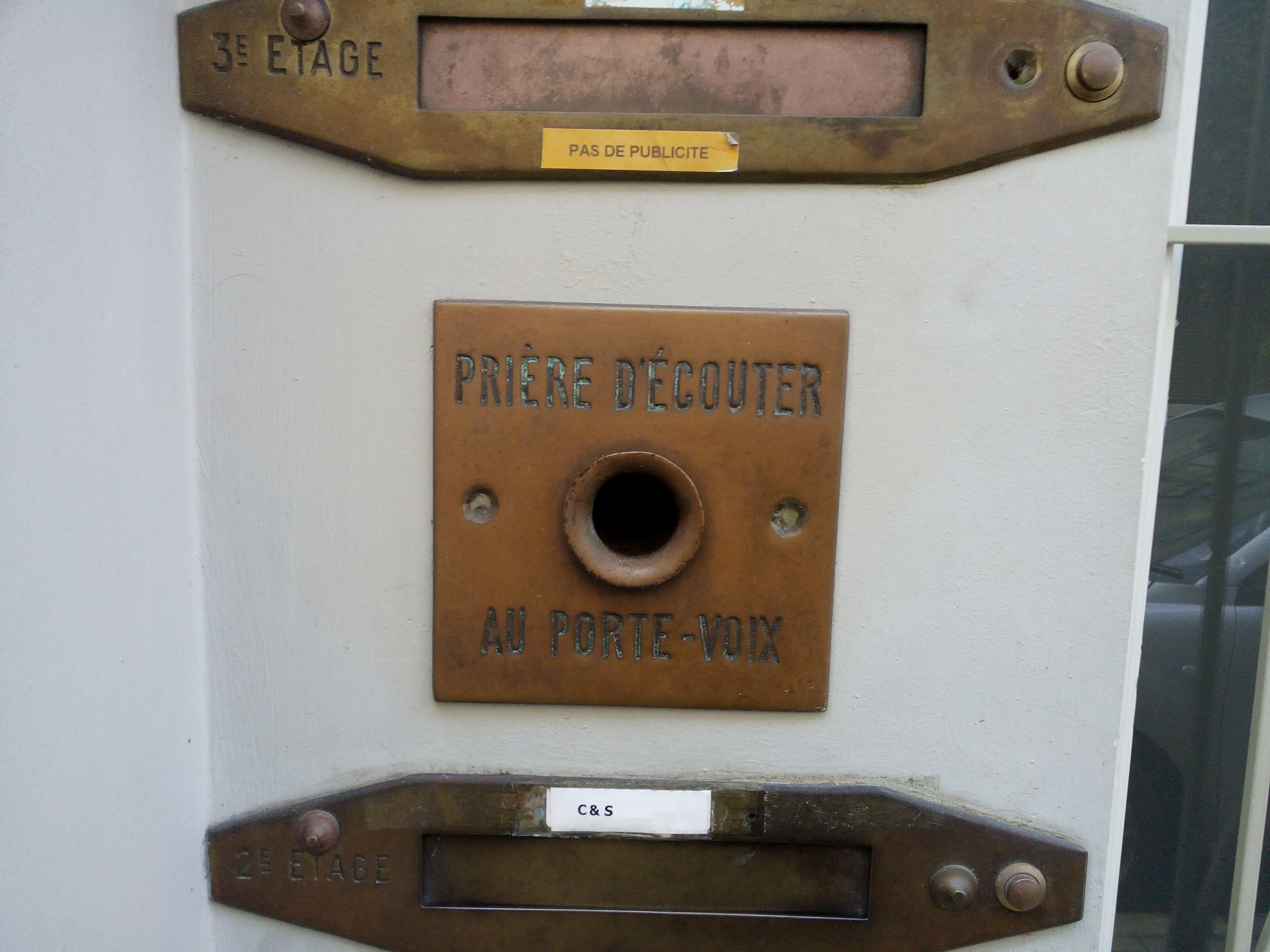
Domestic speaking tube on the sidewalk end. Brussels,(2014) Caption is Please listen to the voice-carrier.

In domestic applications, voicepipes were smaller and referred to as "speaking tubes". The ends of the tube were often flexible for convenience of use. The speaking tube supplemented the array of remotely controlled hand bells that were operated in the upstairs rooms and rang in the servant's quarters in even modest houses in the 19th century. The phrase "get on the horn" and "give him a blow" as well as the use of "blower" as a synonym for "telephone" are generally accepted as having their origin in this feature of speaking tubes.

Speaking tubes, in conjunction with doorbells/buzzers, were commonly used to communicate between a street entranceway and an upstairs apartment, provided the floor was not too high.

Speaking tubes were also employed in some offices, with whistles at either end and were therefore also known as whistling tubes. Several speaking tubes could be hung from the edge of a desk to communicate with different locations.

Speaking tubes were also used in fine automobiles, such as the 1927 Rolls-Royce Phantom, allowing communication between the separate passenger and driver's compartments when desired.

== Gosport tube ==
A Gosport tube was a voice tube used by flight instructors in the early days of military aviation to give instructions and directions to their students. It was invented by flying instructor Robert Raymond Smith-Barry at the School of Special Flying he opened at Gosport in 1917.

== Modern usage ==
Acoustic tube headphones (also called pneumatic earphones or air earphones) are used especially in two-way radio. These are useful because a clear tube can be used to hide the earphones. They are also sometimes used for the microphone on telephonists headsets and to provide music to patients undergoing an MRI scan, as it would be dangerous to use metal wiring in the scanner's magnetic field.

Pneumatic intercoms can be applied to motorcycle helmets for pilot-passenger communication. Similar systems are common on ultralight aviation too. They are sometimes preferred over Bluetooth or other radio technologies due to their simplicity and absence of batteries.

The principle of the speaking tube can be found on certain playground equipment, which employs tubing connecting sound horns or other speaking boxes to allow voices to travel to separate points, for the amusement of the children.

== See also ==
- Acoustic transmission line
- Doppler fetal monitor
- Headphones
- History of the telephone
- Intercom
- Megaphone
- Pipe (fluid conveyance)
- Pneumatic tube
- Stethoscope
- Tin can telephone
