= Tin-can telephone =

Primitive acoustic messaging device

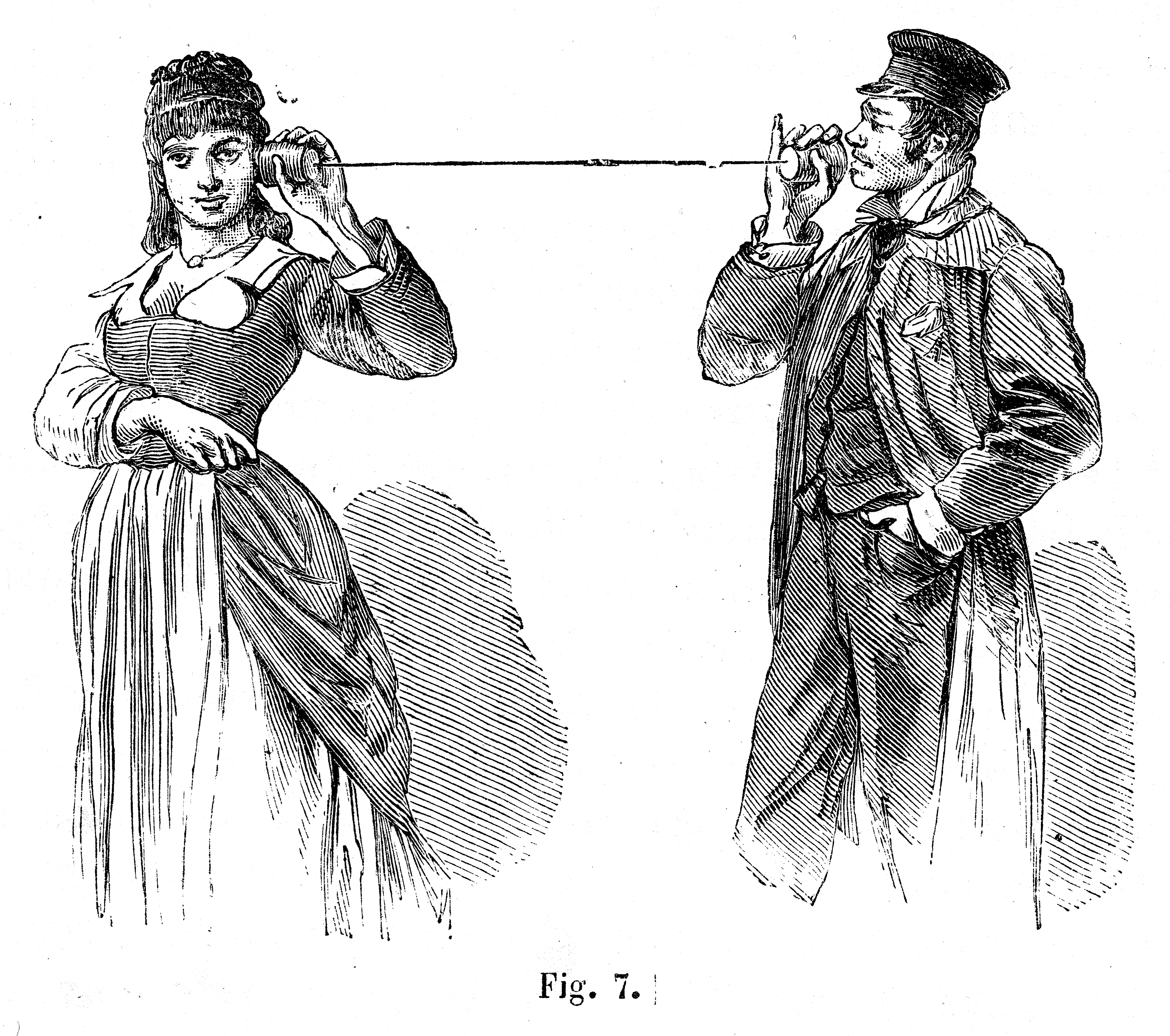
Fig 7 Le Telephone by T du Moncel Paris 1880 (Large)

A tin-can telephone is a type of acoustic (non-electrical) speech-transmitting device made up of two tin cans, paper cups or similarly shaped items attached to either end of a taut string or wire.

It is a particular case of mechanical telephony, where sound (i.e., vibrations in the air) is converted into vibrations along a liquid or solid medium. These vibrations are transmitted through the medium (string) and then converted back to sound.

== History ==
Before the invention of the electromagnetic telephone, there were mechanical acoustic devices for transmitting spoken words and music over a greater distance, faster than the speed of sound in air. The very earliest mechanical telephones were based on transmission through pipes or other physical media, and among the very earliest experiments were those conducted by the British physicist and polymath Robert Hooke from 1664 to 1685. From 1664 to 1665 Hooke experimented with sound transmission through a taut extended wire. An acoustic string phone is attributed to him as early as 1667.

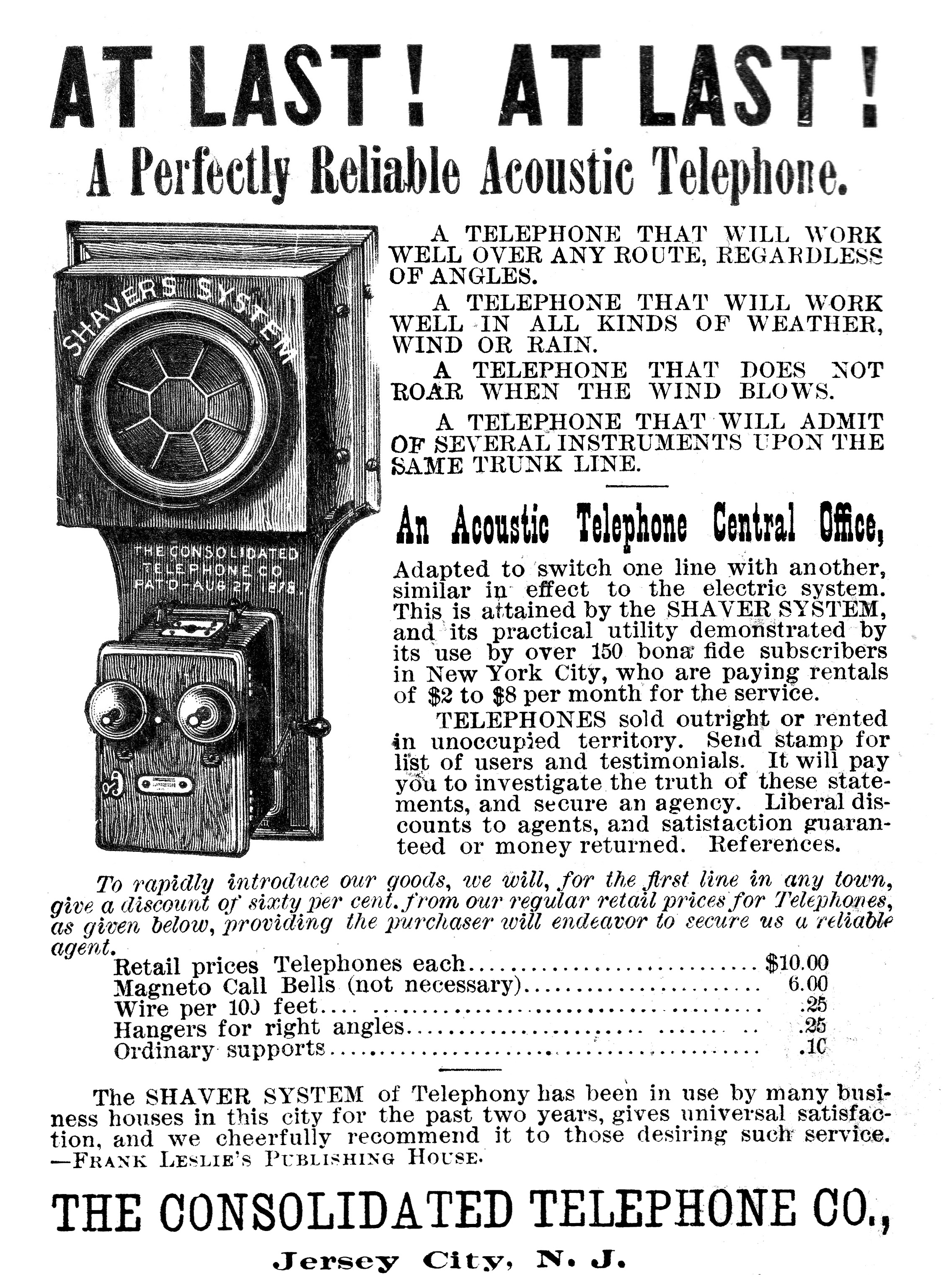
An 1886 advertisement for an acoustic telephone

For a short period, acoustic telephones were marketed commercially as niche competitors to the electrical telephone, as they did not fall within the scope of its patent protection. When Alexander Graham Bell's telephone patent expired and dozens of new phone companies flooded the marketplace, acoustic telephone manufacturers could not compete and quickly went out of business. Their maximum range was very limited, but technical innovations (resulting in about 300 patents) increased their range to approximately 0.5 miles (800 m), or more under ideal conditions. An example of one such company was Lemuel Mellett's Pulsion Telephone Supply Company of Massachusetts, which designed its version in 1888 and deployed it on railroad rights-of-way, purportedly with a range of 3 miles (4.8 km).

In the centuries before tin cans and paper cups became commonplace, other cups were used and the devices were sometimes called "lovers' telephones". During the 20th century, they came into common use in preschools and elementary schools to teach children about sound vibration.

== Operation ==
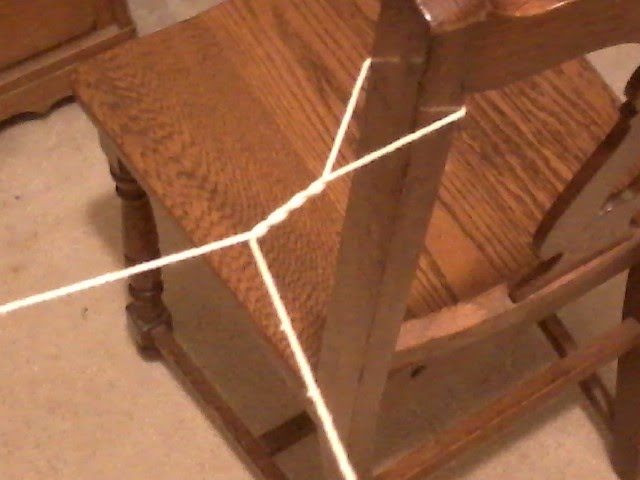
An example of using a twisted loop to direct the string of a can phone into a new direction

When the string is pulled taut and someone speaks into one of the cans, its bottom acts as a diaphragm, converting the sound waves into longitudinal mechanical vibrations which vary the tension of the string. These variations in tension set up longitudinal waves in the string which travel to the second can, causing its bottom to vibrate in a similar manner as the first can, thus recreating the sound, which is heard by the second person.

The signal can be directed around corners with at least two methods: The first is to create a loop in the string which is then twisted and anchored to another object. The second uses an extra can positioned on the apex of the corner; the string is threaded through the base of the can to avoid coming into contact with the object around which the signal is to be directed.

== See also ==
- History of the telephone
- Sound-powered telephone
- Speaking tube
