= W48 (telephone) =

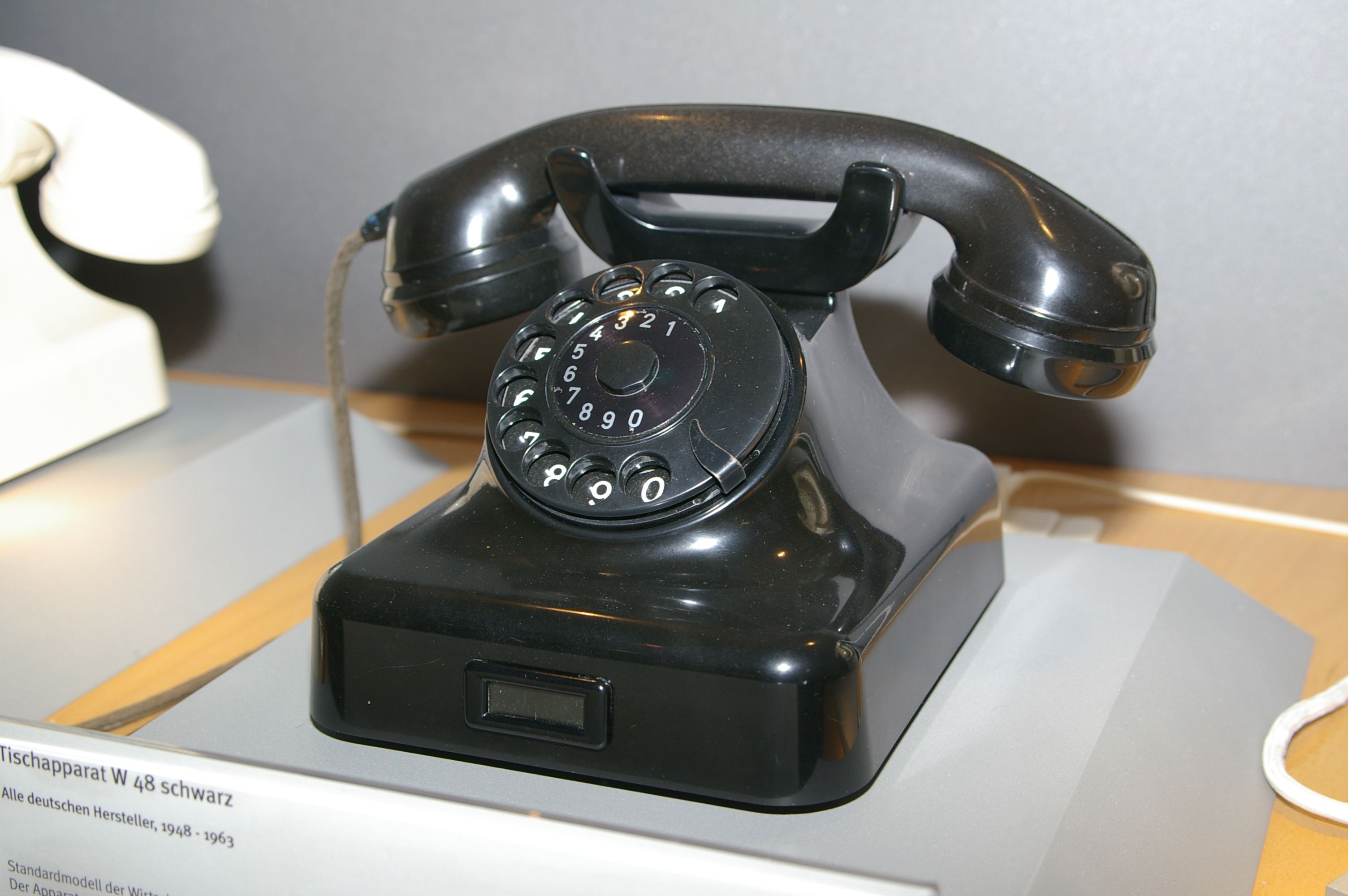
Telephone W48 of the Deutsche Bundespost

The W48 (from German: Wählfernsprecher 1948) was a version of a desktop telephone lineage developed in the mid-1930s in Germany by Siemens & Halske for the German telephone and postal administration.

== Overview ==
The W48 was approved by the Deutsche Bundespost for use on the German telephone network in 1948. Various manufacturers were licensed to produce the large quantities of this type until ca. 1961, when it was replaced with the FeTAp 611.

Because of its former ubiquity, robustness, and elegant industrial design it is regarded in Germany as the classic telephone. It is still produced in small quantities using the original moulds.

== Predecessors ==
The W48 is the successor of the pre-war Modell 36 and the W38, with only a few modifications. The principle design features were based on the "classic" W28, the first widely distributed desktop telephone developed by the Siemens & Halske company and built in license for the German Reichspost from 1928 by several manufacturers.

In the mid 1930s, Siemens & Halske developed the Modell 36 successor, presented at the 1936 Leipzig Trade Fair, but it was rejected for use by the Reichspost, until modifications achieved certification for the 1938 variant (W38).

== See also ==
- Courtesy telephone
