= Sound-powered telephone =

Communication device

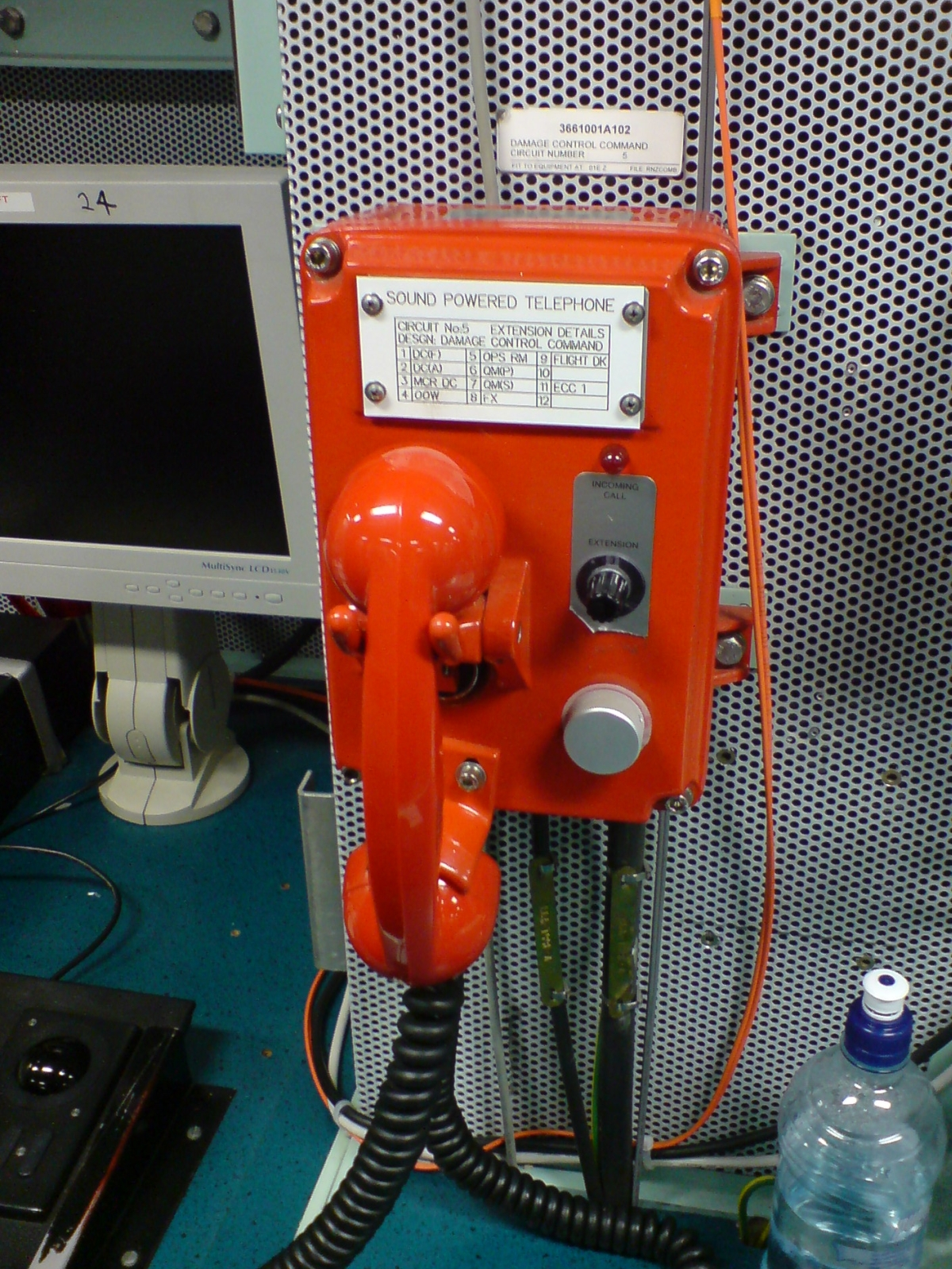
Modern emergency telephone powered by sound alone

A sound-powered telephone is a communication device that allows users to talk to each other with the use of a handset, similar to a conventional telephone, but without the use of external power. This technology has been used since at least 1944 for both routine and emergency communication on ships to allow communication between key locations on a vessel if power is unavailable. A sound-powered phone circuit can have two or more stations on the same circuit. The circuit is always live, thus a user begins speaking rather than dialing another station. Sound-powered telephones are not normally connected to a telephone exchange.

== Operation ==
The microphone transducer converts sound pressure from a user's voice into an electric current, which is then converted back to sound by a transducer at the receiver nodes. The most significant distinction between ordinary telephones and sound-powered telephones is in the operation of the microphone. Since the microphones used in most telephones are designed to modulate a supplied electric current, they cannot be used in sound-powered transducers. Most sound-powered telephones use a dynamic microphone. A common approach to transducer design is the balanced armature design because of its efficiency. The number of simultaneous listeners is limited because there is no amplification of the signal.

A sound-powered telephone circuit can be as simple as two handsets connected together with a pair of wires, which is defined as the "talk" portion of the circuit. Talk circuits can be realized over a pair of wires that are 50 km (30 miles) long. More complex circuits include magnetos, selector switches and bells to allow one user to select and call another, which is defined as the "calling" portion of the circuit. The voice communication ("talk") circuit is completely separate from the "call" circuit, allowing communication to take place without external power.

== Usage ==
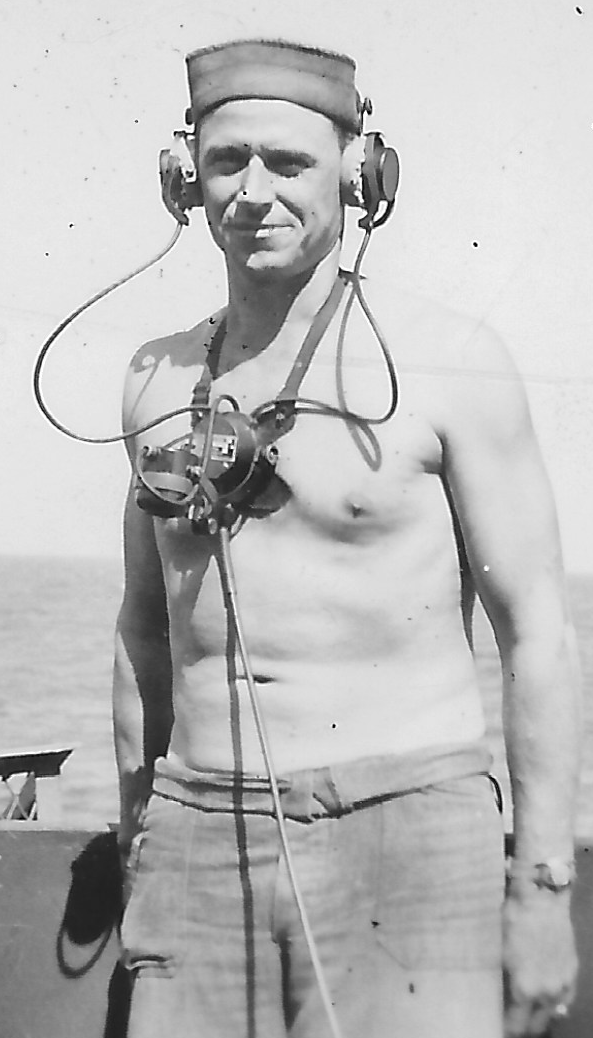
A US Navy lookout using an early sound-powered telephone in the Pacific about 1944

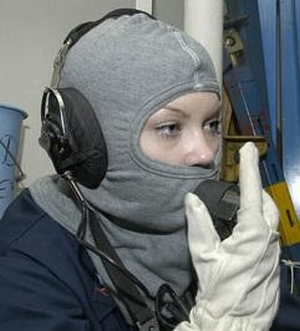
A U.S. Navy petty officer uses a sound-powered telephone during a general quarters drill.

Sound-powered telephones are widely used on ships. A typical example on a U.S. Navy ship is the "JL" circuit which is used by the lookouts to report visual contacts to the pilot house and the Combat Information Center (CIC). In this case there would be five stations on the circuit (stern lookout, port lookout, starboard lookout, pilot house and CIC).

U.S. Coast Guard Regulations require this emergency communication capability in most vessels today and dictate where phones should be located. A dial telephone system with a battery backup will not meet the USCG Regulations as they currently exist.

Other uses for sound-powered telephone technology today include emergency communications systems for high-rise buildings, draw bridges, ski lifts, and temporary locations where reliable communication is necessary. These types of systems allow for two or more parties to be able to talk to one another in areas that experience loss of power or when radio communication is hampered by RF signal losses and/or limitations.

Ski lifts use sound-powered phones extensively. Because there are only two handsets (rarely three, where there is a mid station), sound-powered phones are ideal. They are used to confirm actions of the lift with the other operator, and abnormal operation of the lift machinery.

Many different types of equipment have attempted, but have largely failed, to replace the incredibly simple sound-powered telephones on ships. Due to the rugged, reliable, and power-free nature of this equipment, it remains in use on all US military vessels, commercial vessels and work boats.
