= August 1978 =

Month of 1978

<<	August 1978					>>
Su	Mo	Tu	We	Th	Fr	Sa
		1	2	3	4	5
6	7	8	9	10	11	12
13	14	15	16	17	18	19
20	21	22	23	24	25	26
27	28	29	30	31

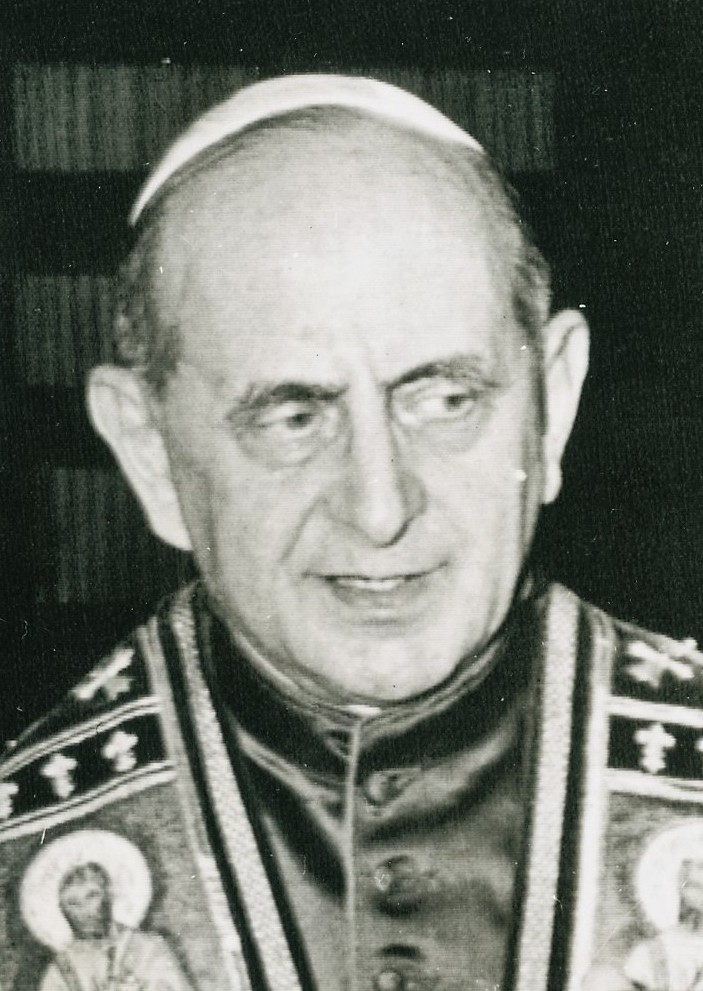
August 6, 1978: Pope Paul VI dies after a reign of 15 years

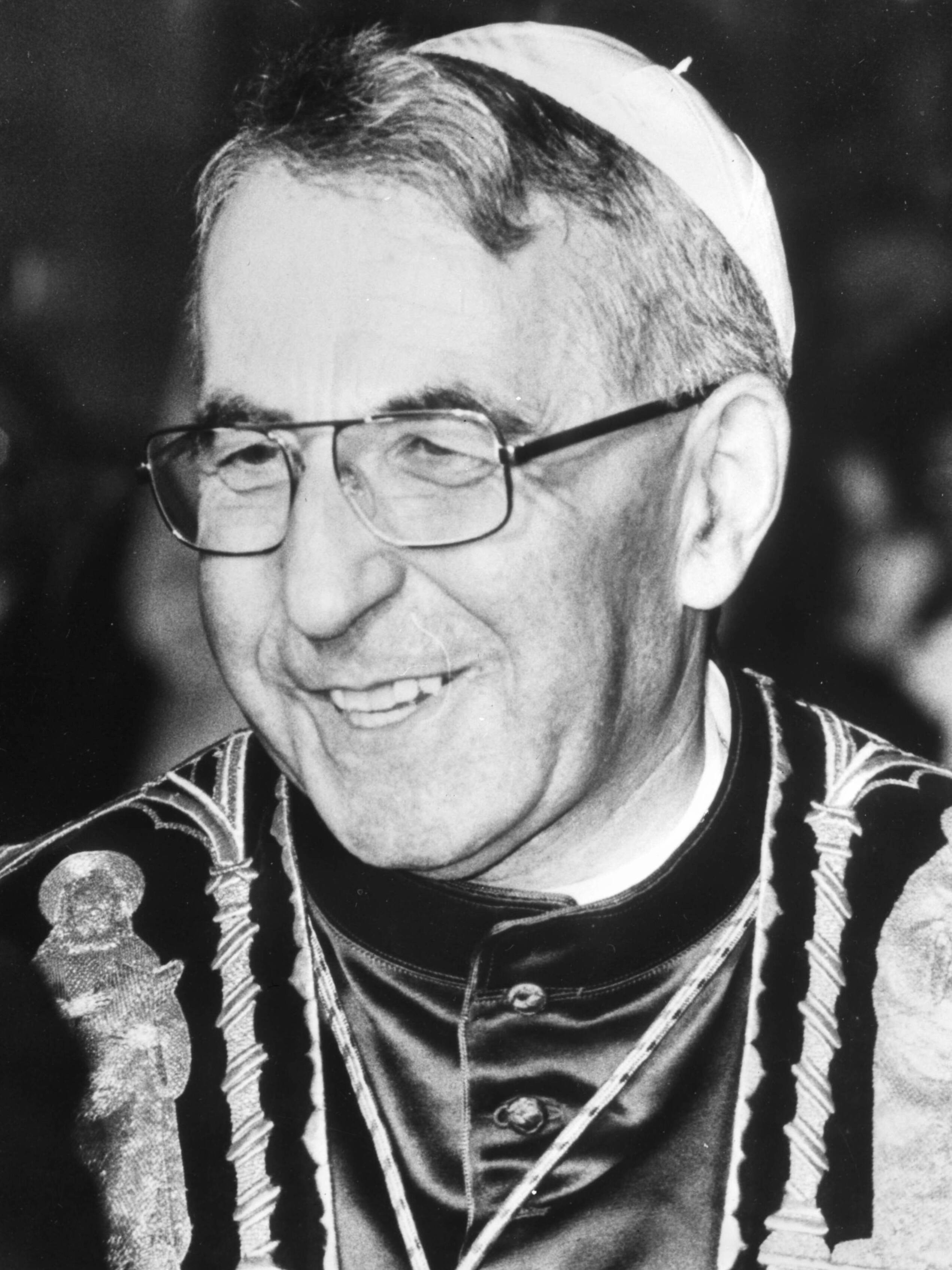
August 26, 1978: Albino Luciani elected Pope John Paul I

The following events occurred in August 1978:

== August 1, 1978 (Tuesday) ==
- The Montoneros terrorist group made an unsuccessful attempt to assassinate the chairman of Argentina's Joint Chiefs of Staff, Rear Admiral Armando Lambruschini, in the bombing of a nine-story apartment building. Lambruschini was uninjured but three civilians were killed, including the Admiral's 15-year-old daughter.

== August 2, 1978 (Wednesday) ==
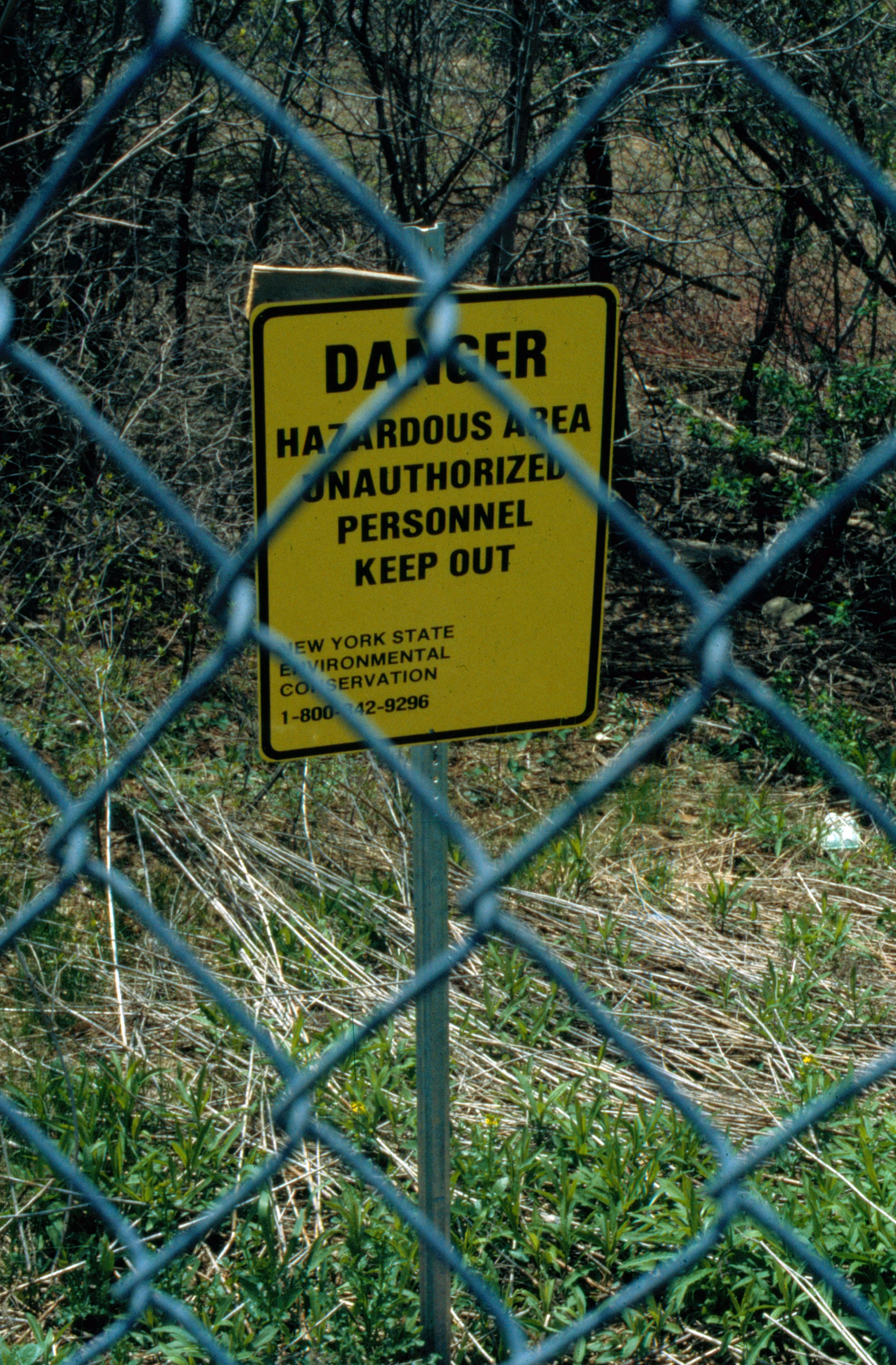
Warning sign at former Love Canal neighborhood

- The Health Commissioner of the U.S. state of New York declared a public health emergency arising from the toxic contamination of the water supply of Niagara Falls, New York, particularly in the Love Canal neighborhood with over 1,000 residences and an elementary school. Dr. Robert P. Whalen initially recommended that "pregnant women should move away at once" from the site and declared it to be "a great and imminent peril to the health of the general public... as a result of exposure to toxic substances." In 1976, two reporters from the Niagara Gazette, David Pollak and David Russell, had first discovered the presence of poisonous substances in a dumpsite that had been used near the Love Canal neighborhood by the Hooker Chemical Company. Another investigative reporter, Michael Brown, followed up in early 1978 and found that residents had suffered a higher rate of illnesses and disabilities than the national average, and that the primary toxic chemical in the dumpsite was dioxin. On August 7, U.S. President Jimmy Carter invoked use of the new Superfund to evacuate the Love Canal neighborhood and then to initiate a cleanup that would continue until 2004; in all, 950 families were relocated.
- Six firefighters were killed and 28 injured while responding to a blaze at the Waldbaum's supermarket at 2892 Ocean Avenue in the Sheepshead Bay neighborhood in Brooklyn in New York City. The group was on top of the building's roof when the structure collapsed.
- Died:
  - Totie Fields (stage name for Sophie Feldman), 48, American comedian, died from a pulmonary embolism the day before she was scheduled to begin two weeks of shows at the Sahara Hotel in Las Vegas.
  - Richard D. Obenshain, 42, Republican nominee for U.S. Senator from Virginia, was killed in a small plane crash while returning to Richmond from a day of campaigning. Obenshain, favored to win the November 7 election to replace retiring Senator William L. Scott, died along with an aide and the pilot of the twin-engine Piper Seneca.John Warner, whom Obenshain had defeated in the Republican primary would become the new nominee. Warner, husband of Elizabeth Taylor, would win in November and retain the U.S. Senate seat until 2009.
  - Carlos Chávez, 79, Mexican composer and conductor who founded the Symphony Orchestra of Mexico (Orquesta Sinfónica de Mexico)
  - Ronald Bannerman, New Zealand World War One flying ace with 17 victories

== August 3, 1978 (Thursday) ==
- Ezzedine Kalak, the Palestine Liberation Organization's diplomatic representative to France since 1973, was assassinated in Paris along with his aide, Adnan Hammad. Two members of the Abu Nidal Organization, Hatem Husni and Kayad Assad, entered the PLO office and shot Kalak and Hamid to death.
- U.S. President Jimmy Carter signed a proclamation designating the first Sunday of September after Labor Day of each year (September 10 in 1978) as 'National Grandparents' Day. Poland had been the first nation to observe a special day for grandparents Day, beginning on January 21, 1965, for Dzień Babci ("Grandma's Day), followed on January 22 for Dzień Dziadka for grandfathers.
- Born: Mariusz Jop, Polish footballer with 27 caps for the Poland National Team; in Ostrowiechttps://us.soccerway.com/players/mariusz-jop/732/|Mariusz Jop], at Soccerway.com
- Died: General Luo Ruiqing, 72, the first Minister of Public Security for the People's Republic of China (from 1949 to 1959), later persecuted during the Cultural Revolution until his rehabilitation and restoration to office in 1975 by the Communist Party, died in Heidelberg, West Germany, where he was undergoing medical treatment.

== August 4, 1978 (Friday) ==
- A bus accident drowned 40 people near Eastman, Quebec, with only 7 survivors, in what was, at the time, the deadliest road accident in Canadian history. The bus had taken a group of handicapped residents of the town of Asbestos, Quebec, to watch a play at the Théâtre de la Marjolaine in Eastman and was returning them home when its brakes failed while it was descending a steep hill toward the Lac d'Argent. The vehicle went across a beach, skimmed across the lake and stopped in water 20 metres (66 ft) deep, where it floated for 15 minutes before sinking. The driver and six volunteers were able to swim to safety, while the people left inside were unable to leave. The bus was found the next day at the bottom of the lake, and had the bodies of 40 passengers.
- A flash flood killed at least nine people in the U.S. town of Albany, Texas and left others missing.
- Died:
  - René Challan, 67, French classical composer
  - Tinsley R. Harrison, 78, American physician and author of the first five editions of Harrison's Principles of Internal Medicine
  - Frank Fontaine, 58, American comedian known for his portrayal of the character "Crazy Gugenheim" on The Jackie Gleason Show

== August 5, 1978 (Saturday) ==
- The Shah of Iran, Mohammed Reza Pahlavi, announced the introduction of Western-type political freedoms in the indefinite future, with legislation to be considered by the Iranian parliament in October. Speaking on TV, the Shah told viewers "We shall give the maximum possible political liberties, freedom of speech and of the press, freedom to stage public demonstrations within the limits of law," but added that "Iran's monarchy, Iran's fate is not something to tamper with."
- At Islamabad in Pakistan, terrorists backed by Iraq invaded the liaison office of the Palestine Liberation Organization and fired submachine guns, killing four people, in an attempt to assassinate the Yousaf Abu Hantash, the PLO diplomatic representative. Shouting out Hantash's name, the two gunmen were unable to recognize him from among the crowd of Palestinians who were visiting the office at the time.
- Born: Carolina Duer, Argentine boxer and holder of the women's bantamweight title in the International Boxing Federation (IBF) bantamweight title and the World Boxing Organization (WBO); in Buenos Aires
- Died: Arshad al-Umari, 90, Prime Minister of Iraq during 1946 and 1954

== August 6, 1978 (Sunday) ==
- At 9:41 in the evening local time, Pope Paul VI died at his residence at Castel Gandolfo in Italy. The Pope, who had guided the Roman Catholic church for 15 years, received communion from his bed during the 6:00 Sunday mass and then suffered a massive heart attack. He remained lucid and, an hour before his death, said that he felt dizzy. Jean-Marie Villot, the Vatican Secretary of State, temporarily assumed the duties of administering the Church until a successor could be elected.
- Elections for parliament were held in Panama, with 1,927 independent candidates competing for the 505 seats of the National Assembly of Community Representatives (Asamblea Nacional de Representantes de Corregimientos)
- Born:
  - Peng Cheng-min, Taiwanese professional baseball player and 2010 Most Valuable Player of the Chinese Professional Baseball League; in Kaoshiung
  - Lee Ji-ah, South Korean television and film actress; in Songpa District of Seoul
  - Freeway (stage name for Leslie Edward Pridgen, American rap music artist; in Philadelphia
- Died:
  - Pope Paul VI (Giovanni Battista Montini), 80, leader of the Roman Catholic Church since 1963
  - Edward Durell Stone, 76, American architect known for designing the Museum of Modern Art, in New York City, the and the John F. Kennedy Center for the Performing Arts in Washington, D.C

== August 7, 1978 (Monday) ==
- General Juan Alberto Melgar Castro, who had become President of Honduras in 1975 when he led a military coup d'état to overthrow President Oswaldo López Arellano, was removed by another military coup and replaced by a three-man junta led by General Policarpo Paz Garcia.
- Hans Filbinger, the Ministerpräsident of the West German state of Baden-Württemberg, similar to a U.S. state governor, resigned after the newspaper Die Zeit revealed that he had sentenced at least four people to death in Nazi Germany as a military judge.
- Julio César Turbay was inaugurated to a 4-year term as the 25th President of Colombia.
- Born: Alexandre Aja, stage name for Alexandre Jouan-Arcady, French film director known for horror films; in Paris
- Died: Jovita Fuentes, 83, Philippine soprano singer

== August 8, 1978 (Tuesday) ==
- The Pioneer 13 probe to the planet Venus was launched by the U.S. from Cape Canaveral at 2:33 in the morning local time (0733 UTC). Carrying four separate smaller descent modules, the spacecraft arrived at Venus on December 9.
- The Bidong Island refugee camp opened in Malaysia for 121 Vietnamese "boat people", the first of thousands of people who had arrived at the camp after escaping in boats from the former South Vietnam.
- Egypt's president Anwar Sadat and Israel's prime minister Menachem Begin accepted an invitation from U.S. president Jimmy Carter to meet at Camp David in order to work out a peace agreement.
- Born: Louis Saha, French footballer with 20 caps for the France national team; in Paris
- Died: Jean Juge, 70, Swiss physicist at the University of Geneva, skier and mountaineer, president of the International Climbing and Mountaineering Federation from 1972 to 1976, died of exhaustion after successfully climbing the north face of the 14,690 feet (4,480 m) Matterhorn, the highest peak in Switzerland's Alps. Juge refused to follow his two climbers back down to a shelter during difficult weather conditions, and a colleague told reporters, "That's the way he always wanted to die."

== August 9, 1978 (Wednesday) ==
- In Greece, the pilot and co-pilot of Olympic Airways Flight 411 were able to save all 418 people on board and to prevent the Boeing 747 from crashing into downtown Athens. At 2:00 in the afternoon, the aircraft took off from Ellinikon International Airport with a crew of 18 and 400 passengers bound for New York's JFK Airport. One of the engines failed and a member of the crew mistakenly turned off the water pump switch, preventing the airplane from climbing higher than 35 feet (11 m) in altitude. Captain Sifis Migadis and Captain Kostas Fikardos were able to keep the other engines from stalling and climbed to 209 feet (64 m), narrowly clearing 200 feet (61 m)-high Pani Hill at Alimos, dropping to an altitude of 180 feet (55 m) as it flew over apartment buildings in the suburbs of Kallithea, Nea Smyrni, and Syggrou. The flight engineer was able to increase engine power sufficiently to increase altitude and to make a gradual turn to avoid impact with 1,539 feet (469 m) Mount Aigaleo, after which Migadis and Fikardos flew over the Aegean Sea, dumped most of its heavy load of fuel, and safely landed back at the airport.
- Born: Daniela Denby-Ashe, English TV actress known for the BBC sitcom My Family; in London,
- Died:
  - James Gould Cozzens, 74, American novelist known for Guard of Honor and By Love Possessed
  - Julien Ghyoros, 55, Belgian composer and orchestra conductor

== August 10, 1978 (Thursday) ==
- All three of New York City's major newspapers— The New York Times, the Daily News, and the New York Post — ceased publication after failing to come to an agreement with the Printing Pressman's Union for a new contract. and would remain inactive for several months, temporarily replaced by The City News, "edited by out-of-work staff members of the Daily News and the Times", The New York Daily Press, and The New York Daily Metro. The New York Post and its publisher, Rupert Murdoch, reached an agreement with the striking labor union and resumed publishing on October 5. The Times and the Daily News would not resume publication until on November 6.
- Nine people were killed and 25 injured in the collision of two trains in Sweden near Ostersund.
- Meeting in Canterbury in England, the Lambeth Conference, a decennial assembly of over 400 Anglican bishops from all over the world voted overwhelmingly to endorse the ordination of women as priests in the Episcopal and Anglican church organizations in the U.S. and in three other nations, but left the question of women priests to be decided by each nation on its own.
- A group of 43 Roman Catholic cardinals voted to set the papal conclave, to elect a successor to the late Pope Paul VI, to begin within 10 days, on August 25.
- The Progress 3 supply capsule, launched without a crew, made the largest delivery of supplies up to that time for an orbiting space station as it docked at the Salyut 6 orbiter.

== August 11, 1978 (Friday) ==
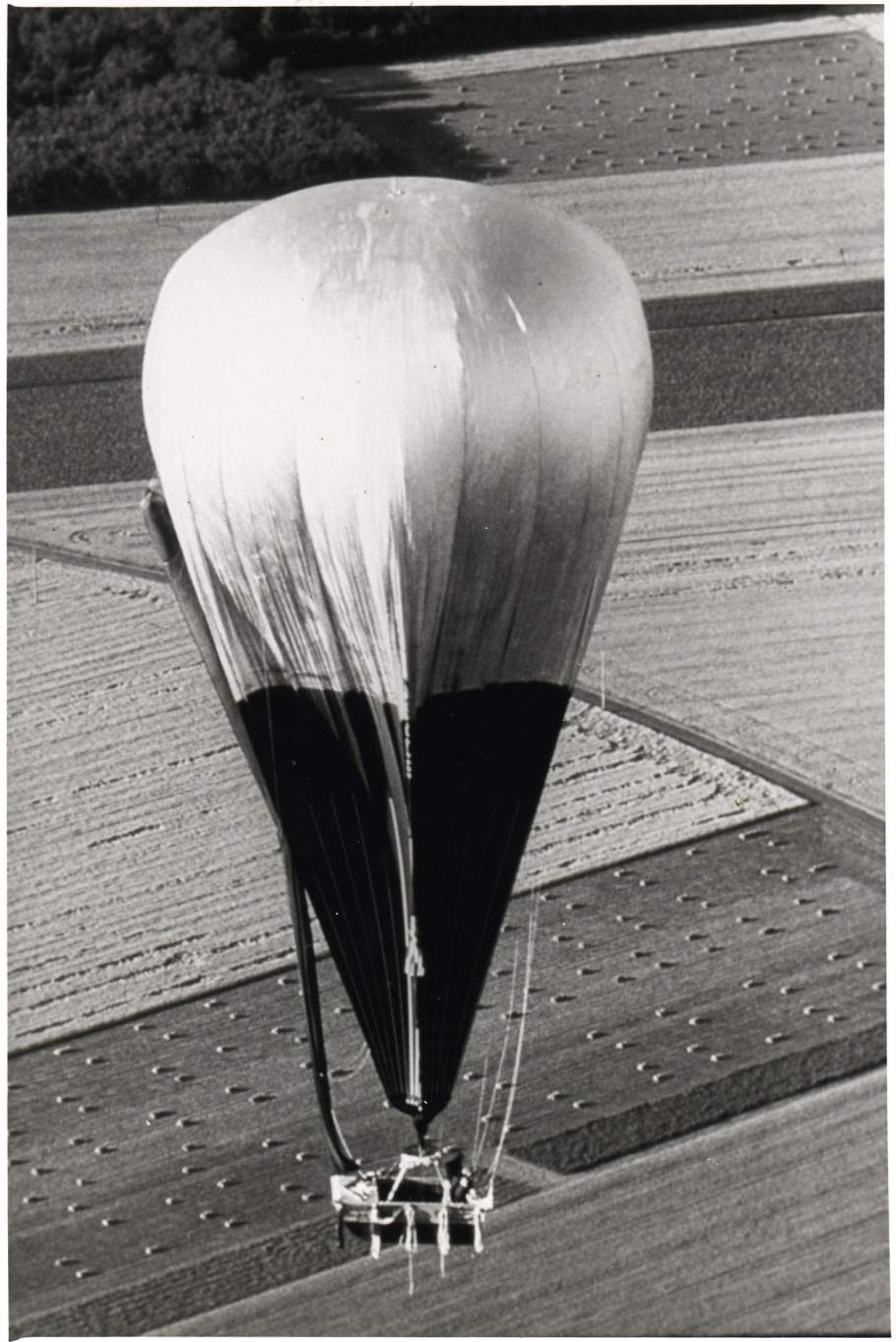
The Double Eagle II lifts off

- Three aviators began the 14th known attempt to fly a balloon across the Atlantic Ocean, lifting off at 8:43 in the evening from the town of Presque Isle in the U.S. state of Maine, with a goal of flying across the Atlantic Ocean and landing near Paris
- U.S. President Jimmy Carter signed the American Indian Religious Freedom Act into law.

== August 12, 1978 (Saturday) ==
- The Treaty of Peace and Friendship between Japan and the People's Republic of China was signed in Beijing by China's Foreign Minister Huang Hua and Japan's Minister of Foreign Affairs, Sunao Sonoda, and would become effective on October 23, 1978. Under the treaty, each nation pledged not to seek control (hegemony) of the Asia or the Pacific, and to prevent other nations from attempting to do so. The Soviet Union had objected to the treaty as a hostile act by Japan.
- The International Cometary Explorer (ICE), originally referred to as International Sun-Earth Explorer-3 (ISEE-3) was launched from Cape Canaveral in the U.S. and placed into orbit on a joint NASA and European Space Agency mission to study comets. On September 11, 1985, it would become the first Earth spacecraft to visit a comet, gathering data as it passed within 4,800 miles (7,700 km) of 21P/Giacobini–Zinner.
- Darryl Stingley of the New England Patriots was seriously injured and left paralyzed from the neck down by a hit from Jack Tatum of the Oakland Raiders in a preseason game in Oakland.
- A week before the opening of the 1978–79 Football League season in England, the 56th annual FA Charity Shield match was played between Nottingham Forest F.C. (the first-place finisher in the 1977–78 regular season, eliminated in the quarter-finals of the FA Cup competition), and Ipswich Town F.C. (winner of the 1978 FA Cup tournament champion after finishing in 18th place in the 22-team league). Nottingham Forest won, 5 to 0, in front of a crowd of 68,000 fans at Wembley Stadium.
- Died: Marie Vassiltchikov, 61, Russian princess and author of Berlin Diaries, 1940-1945, died of leukemia.

== August 13, 1978 (Sunday) ==
- The bombing of a 9-story building in the Lebanon capital of Beirut killed 121 people as terrorists, believed to be from the al-Fatah (PLO) the militant wing of the Palestine Liberation Organization, were targeting the Iraqi-backed Palestine Liberation Front (PLF).
- Three men, Stuart Glass of Canada, John Dewhirst of Australia and Kerry Hamill of New Zealand, had the misfortune of being blown off course in a storm while sailing from Singapore to Bangkok on their Chinese sailing vessel, Foxy Lady and captured by the gunboats of the Khmer Rouge while seeking shelter on Cambodia's Koh Tang island. Glass was shot and killed when the Khmer Rouge began firing on the sailboat, while Dewhirst and Hamill were transported to the S-21 prison in Phnom Penh where they were tortured and forced to write confessions. Dewhirst was executed shortly afterward and Hamill was executed in October.
- In the U.S. city of Cleveland, Ohio, roughly 120,000 voters participated in a rare Sunday election to decide whether to recall Mayor Dennis Kucinich from office. Kucinich retained his office by a margin of only 236 votes. The final margin was 60,014 to remove Kucinich and 60,250 to retain him in office.
- A 5.1 magnitude earthquake injured almost 100 people in the U.S. city of Santa Barbara, California and derailed a freight train, but caused no fatalities and only minimal property damage.

== August 14, 1978 (Monday) ==
- Prime Minister Ian Smith of the white-minority ruled African nation of Rhodesia began the first of several secret trips to neighboring nation of Zambia to meet with Joshua Nkomo, chairman of the Zimbabwe People's Revolutionary Army (ZIPRA).
- All 18 people aboard an Aeropesco flight were killed in a crash in Colombia when the Curtiss C-46 Commando struck Mount Paramo de Laura in the Boyacá Department near Tota while flying from Bogotá to Tame.
- Construction began on the Victoria Dam in Sri Lanka, and would be completed by April 12, 1985.
- The crash of a U.S. Marine Corps Douglas C-117 turboprop airplane into the South Pacific Ocean killed James Joseph, the U.S. Undersecretary of the Interior, his deputy Wallace Green, and Ruth Cleive, the Director of the U.S. Office of Territorial Affairs, as well as the pilot. The C-117 had departed Guam and was en route to the Marshall Islands when it plunged into the sea shortly after takeoff.
- On the TV station WJZ-TV in Baltimore, the show People Are Talking premiered, co-hosted by newscaster Richard Sher and a 24-year-old reporter, Oprah Winfrey in her first role hosting a talk show. After a little more than five years, Winfrey would relocate to the Chicago TV station WLS-TV to replace the host on AM Chicago and soon become one of the most popular television personalities in American history.
- Died:
  - Norman Feather, 73, English nuclear physicist who made the breakthrough (with Egon Bretscher) on Britain's Tube Alloys project to develop the first British nuclear weapon
  - Nicolas Bentley, 61, British writer and illustrator best known for The Floating Dutchman
  - Giuseppe "Joe" Venuti, pioneer jazz violinist

== August 15, 1978 (Tuesday) ==
- Clemente Domínguez y Gómez of Spain, who had founded the Palmarian Christian Church as an offshoot of the Roman Catholic Church upon the death of the Roman Catholic pontiff, Pope Paul VI, held a coronation of himself as the true successor to the Catholic leadership and took the regnal name Pope Gregory XVII.
- Born:
  - Kerri Walsh Jennings, American professional beach volleyball player for the U.S. women's beach volleyball player that won the gold medal in the 2004, 2008 and 2012 summer Olympics; in Santa Clara, California. Walsh grew up in Scotts Valley
  - Waleed Aly, popular Australian journalist and television host; in Melbourne

== August 16, 1978 (Wednesday) ==
- A U.S. federal grand jury returned indictments against 11 high-ranking members of the Church of Scientology, charging them with conspiracy to infiltrate, burglarize and plant listening devices in the offices of the Internal Revenue Service, the U.S. Department of Justice and other federal agencies. Nine of the eleven defendants pleaded guilty in 1979, and the remaining two defendants were convicted after a trial—each received jail sentences ranging from six months to five years.
- Born:
  - Andriy Kobolyev, Ukrainian entrepreneur and former CEO of Naftogaz, Ukraine's state-owned oil and gas company; in Kiev, Ukrainian SSR, Soviet Union
  - Madingo Afework, Ethiopian singer; in Azezo (died of illness, 2022)
- Died:
  - Paul Yu Pin, 77, Archbishop of Nanking since 1946 and a Roman Catholic Cardinal since 1969, died shortly after arriving in Rome to participate in the papal conclave to elect a successor to Pope Paul VI.
  - Alidius Tjarda van Starkenborgh, 90, the last Governor-General of the Dutch East Indies (now Indonesia), from 1936 to 1942

== August 17, 1978 (Thursday) ==
- At 7:50 in the evening local time, Double Eagle II, piloted by Ben Abruzzo, Maxie Anderson and Larry Newman, became the first balloon to fly across the Atlantic Ocean, landing on a farm near the village of Miserey in the département of Eure in France and 60 mi (97 km) northwest of Paris. The aircraft had departed five days earlier from Presque Isle, Maine in the United States.
- Born:
  - Karena Lam, Canadian-born Hong Kong actress, winner of three Golden Horse Awards (for Best New Performer, Best Supporting Actress and Best Lead Actress; in Vancouver
  - Maria Yumeno, Japanese pink film and adult video star; in Tokyo
  - Jelena Karleuša, Serbian singer described as "The Lady Gaga of Serbia"; in Belgrade, Yugoslavia, now the Republic of Serbia
  - Shahram Mokri, Iranian film producer and director known for Careless Crime, about the Cinema Rex fire of August 19, 1978; in Kermanshah
  - Tan Dhesi, British politician of Indian descent, and the first turbaned Sikh MP; in Slough, Berkshire
- Died:
  - Vera Maretskaya, 72, Soviet Russian stage and film actress, star if the 1955 film Mati and the 1957 film The Village Teacher; in Barvikha
  - Ahmet Kireççi, 63, Turkish heavyweight wrestler and gold medalist in the 1948 Summer Olympics, was killed in a traffic accident in his hometown of Mersin.

== August 18, 1978 (Friday) ==
- The Indian Coast Guard, entrusted with patrolling the territorial waters of India was established by the Coast Guard Act, 1978, as an agency of the Ministry of Defence.
- A tsunami drowned 10 people in El Salvador's resort town of Acajutla and left 2,000 people homeless after a 5.5 magnitude earthquake.
- Born: Andy Samberg, American comedian and actor known for Saturday Night Live (2005 to 2012), and winner of a Golden Globe Award for Brooklyn Nine-Nine; in Berkeley, California

== August 19, 1978 (Saturday) ==
- An intentionally set fire killed at least 377 people (and perhaps as many as 470) in a movie theater in Iran's city of Abadan. On a Saturday night, hundreds of people were watching the film The Deer (Gavaznha) when a group of four extremists doused the outside of the building with airplane fuel and blocked the exit doors from the outside. At 10:21 in the evening, the fire was first noticed. Another 223 people were injured and 100 were able to escape to the roof of the cinema building.
- German pilot Dieter Schmitt became the first person to fly alone, without stopping, across the North Pole, landing at 5:38 p.m. in Munich local time, 33 hours after departing from the U.S. in Anchorage, Alaska.
- Died:
  - Emilio Núñez Portuondo, 79, President of the UN Security Council in September 1956 and Prime Minister of Cuba for four days in March 1958
  - Max Mallowan, 74, British archaeologist and expert in the Near East, husband of mystery writer Agatha Christie

== August 20, 1978 (Sunday) ==
- Five teenaged boys disappeared after last being seen on Clinton Avenue in the U.S. city of Newark, New Jersey. The crime would remain unsolved for 30 years until Philander Hampton confessed that he and another man, Lee Anthony Evans, had lured the five boys to Hampton's Newark residence, locked them into a closet and burned the house down.
- Five young women, ranging in age from 19 to 24, disappeared in Singapore after being lured onto a cargo ship on the pretense of selling their services as prostitutes. The only trace of the women's fate was a severed right hand of a victim, found floating in the sea six days after. As of 2023, the crime would remain unsolved.
- Born: Noah Bean, American TV and film actor; in Boston
- Died: Diana Budisavljević, 87, Austrian humanitarian known for saving 10,000 Serbian Orthodox Christian women and children from Ustaše concentration camps in the Nazi-established Independent State of Croatia in Yugoslavia during World War II.

== August 21, 1978 (Monday) ==
- Marais Viljoen, president of the South African Senate, became the acting President of South Africa, a largely ceremonial job, when Nico Diederichs died of a heart attack. Viljoen scheduled a presidential election for September 29.
- Born: Alan Lee, Irish-born footballer who played 19 season in the English League and made 10 appearances for the Republic of Ireland national team; in Galway; in
- Died:
  - Charles Eames, 71, American industrial designer and architect and co-designer with his wife, Ray-Bernice Eames of innovative office furniture
  - Charles H. Loeb, 73, African-American investigative journalist and war correspondent known as "The Dean of Black Newsmen"

== August 22, 1978 (Tuesday) ==
- A group of 20 Sandinista Liberation Front guerrillas, led by Edén Pastora and opposed to the continued dictatorship of Nicaragua by the Somoza family, captured the National Palace in Managua while the Chamber of Deputies was in session and took hundreds of people inside as hostages. After two days, the government agreed to pay $500,000 and to release 59 political prisoners, as well as giving Pastora and the other Sandinistas safe passage.
- Daniel arap Moi was sworn in as the new President of Kenya upon the death of President Jomo Kenyatta, who had led the east African nation since Kenya had become independent in 1964. The oath was administered to Moi by the white and English-born Chief Justice of the Kenyan Supreme Court, Sir James Wicks.
- The U.S. Senate narrowly approved the proposed District of Columbia Voting Rights Amendment by a vote of 67 to 32, one vote more than necessary two-thirds necessary for submitting an amendment for ratification by at least 38 states. In doing so, the Senate joined the U.S. House of Representatives, which had approved it in March, 289 to 127. Under U.S. constitutional rules for submitting new amendments by a vote of two-thirds of both houses of Congress, the action became effective without the approval of the president. The proposed amendment, which would have given the District of Columbia two seats in the Senate and one in the House, but would not have given D.C. statehood, was never ratified by the necessary three-fourths majority of the states.
- The U.S. Navy frigate USS Whipple rescued all 410 Vietnamese refugees from a rickety 60 feet (18 m) boat in the South China Sea during a storm, and transported them to Hong Kong for transfer to the U.N. High Commission for refugees.
- Born: James Corden English comedian known in the UK for the BBC sitcom Gavin & Stacey and the U.S. for The Late Late Show with James Corden talk show; in Hillingdon, London,
- Died: Jomo Kenyatta, 89, President of Kenya since its independence; he was succeeded by his vice-president, Daniel Arap Moi

== August 23, 1978 (Wednesday) ==
- The People's Liberation Army of Namibia (PLAN), carrying out revenge against the South African Defence Force (SADF) for the Cassinga Massacre of May 4, scored a direct hit on an SADF military barracks at Katima Mulilo in South-West Africa (now Namibia) with an 82mm mortar shell. Ten SADF personnel were killed and 10 more injured.
- Born:
  - Kobe Bryant, American pro basketball guard and 2008 NBA Most Valuable Player, five-time NBA champion, gold medalist for the U.S. team in the 2008 and 2012 Summer Olympics, and posthumous inductee to the Basketball Hall of Fame; in Philadelphia (killed in helicopter crash, 2020)
  - Kenny Bartram, American freestyle motocross rider, 2001 Summer X Games gold medalist; in Stillwater, Oklahoma
- Died:
  - Agustín Isunza, 77, prolific Mexican comedian and character actor
  - Raffaele de Courten, 89, former Italian admiral and the last Chief of Staff of the Royal Italian Navy

== August 24, 1978 (Thursday) ==
- Near Rock, Kansas, seven U.S. Air Force personnel were injured, two of them fatally, when a Titan II rocket leaked propellant inside the missile silo where it was housed. Staff Sergeant Robert Thomas died immediately, while Airman First Class Erby Hepstall died in a hospital from his lung injuries.
- Died: Louis Prima, 67, American bandleader and trumpeter

== August 25, 1978 (Friday) ==
- A papal conclave opened in Rome to elect a successor to the late Pope Paul VI, with 112 members of the College of Cardinals present. On the first ballot, Cardinal Giuseppe Siri of Genoa received 25 votes followed by 23 for Albino Luciani, and 18 for Sergio Pignedoli, all short of the 75 votes necessary to be elected.
- All 11 people aboard a Webber Airlines seaplane were killed when the Grumman G-21 Goose aircraft crashed into the sea as it was preparing to land at Labouchere Bay on Prince of Wales Island after a 75 miles (121 km) flight from Ketchikan, Alaska.
- Born:
  - Giddens Ko (pen name for Ke Jingting), Taiwanese novelist and filmmaker; in Changhua City{
  - Kel Mitchell, American comedian and co-star with Kenan Thompson in the Nickelodeon sitcom Kenan & Kel; in Chicago
  - Antoine Bauza, French game designer known for the board game 7 Wonders; in Valence, département of Drôme
  - Robert Mohr, German rugby union player with 33 caps for the Germany national rugby union team; in Hannover, West Germany
- Died: Muhammad Naji Al-Mahlawi, 71, pioneering Egyptian nephrologist

== August 26, 1978 (Saturday) ==
- Cardinal Albino Luciani, the Roman Catholic Archbishop of Venice, was elected as the 263rd Pope by the College of Cardinals, succeeding the late Pope Paul VI and taking the regnal name of Pope John Paul I. At 6:24 in the evening local time, smoke appeared from the chimney of the Sistine Chapel, indicating a result after four rounds of balloting, but without certainty of whether a candidate had received the necessary two-thirds of votes to be the new Pontiff. After an hour, Cardinal Pericle Felici stepped onto the balcony of St. Peter's Basilica and delivered the Habemus Papam ("We have a Pope") announcement in Latin, announcing Luciani's election. At 7:31, Pope John Paul I stepped onto the balcony to deliver a blessing and to confirm his acceptance of the papacy.

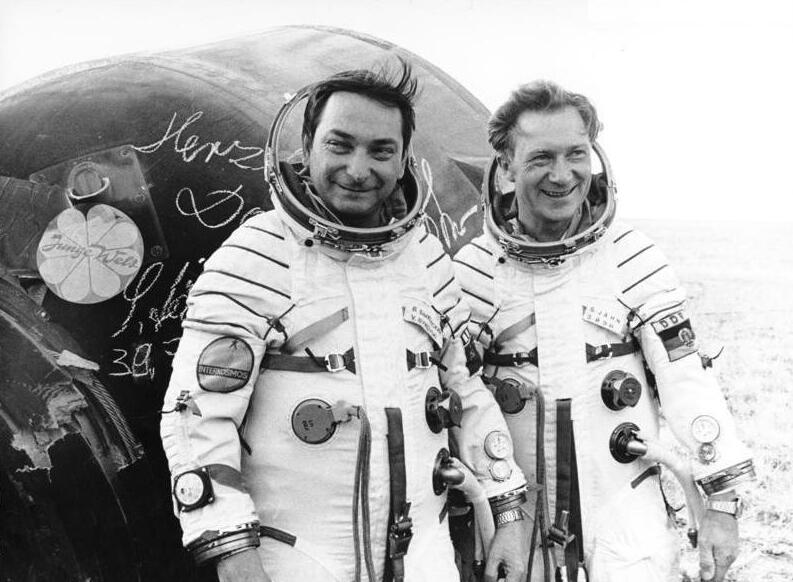
Bykovsky and Jähn

- Sigmund Jähn of East Germany became the first German cosmonaut ("Raumfahrer") as he and veteran space traveler Valery Bykovsky were launched into orbit on the Soviet Soyuz 31 space mission.
- All 14 people on a Burma Airways airplane flight from Papun to Bagan were killed shortly after the de Havilland Canada DHC-6 Twin Otter 300 crashed on takeoff.
- Born:
  - Amanda Schull, American film and TV actress, former professional ballet dancer; in Honolulu
  - Adrián Silva Moreno, Mexican freelance journalist; in Orizaba, Veracruz state (murdered, 2012)
  - Alberto Beloki, Spanish Basque jai alai (pelota vasca) player; in Burlada, Navarre province
- Died:
  - Charles Boyer, 78, French-born American film, stage and TV actor, committed suicide by taking an overdose of the barbiturate Seconal. Boyer took his life two days after the death, from cancer, of his wife Pat Paterson.
  - José Manuel Moreno, 62, Argentine footballer with 34 caps for the Argentina national team
  - Charles Haubiel, 86, American opera and symphony composer

== August 27, 1978 (Sunday) ==
- Jamshid Amouzegar resigned as Prime Minister of the Imperial State of Iran and was replaced by Senate president (and former premier) Jafar Sharif-Emami. As his first official act, Premier Sharif-Emami ordered police to shut down all gambling casinos in Iran in order to comply with Islamic law.
- The championship of the Japan Soccer League, the JSL Cup, was won by Mitsubishi Motors, 2 to 1, over Fujita Industries at Okayama Athletic Stadium in Okayama.
- Born: Suranne Jones (stage name for Sarah Ann Akers), English TV drama actress known for Scott & Bailey and for Coronation Street; in Chadderton, Greater Manchester
- Died:
  - Stanisław Baranowski, 43, Polish glaciologist, who had been in a coma since January after being poisoned by gas escaping from a leaking cylinder at the Henryk Arctowski Polish Antarctic Station, died without regaining consciousness. The Spitsbergen Polar Station in the Arctic, co-founded by Baranowski, and the Baranowski Glacier would be named in his honor.
  - Gordon Matta-Clark, 35, American architect, artist and restaurateur, died of pancreatic cancer

== August 28, 1978 (Monday) ==
- One of the most heinous murder cases in modern India began in New Delhi when two teenagers, Geeta Chopra and her younger brother Sanjay Chopra accepted a car ride from two men during rainy weather. The two Chopra children were spotted attempting to fight their kidnappers, and although police had encountered Kuljeet Singh and Jasbir Singh and detained them temporarily, the two children were never located alive and their bodies were found two days later. The kidnappers would be hanged in 1982 following their conviction of murder.
- All seven crew of a Soviet Navy Tupolev Tu-16 "Badger" bomber and reconnaissance jet were killed when the aircraft crashed on the Arctic Ocean island of Hopen, a territory of Norway. The Soviets refused to acknowledge the existence or demise of the Badger bomber until Norway returned the bodies of the crew.
- Died:
- Robert Shaw, 51, English stage and film actor known for A Man for All Seasons as well as Jaws, The Sting, The Taking of Pelham One Two Three, and Black Sunday, died of a heart attack while driving to his residence in Ireland.
- Kofi Abrefa Busia, 65 Prime Minister of Ghana from 1969 to 1972
- Bruce Catton, 78, American historian and Pulitzer Prize winner known for A Stillness at Appomattox
- F. Van Wyck Mason, American novelist of historical fiction and spy thrillers, drowned while swimming off of the coast of Bermuda.

== August 29, 1978 (Tuesday) ==
- In order to end hostilities in the civil war in Chad, President Félix Malloum appointed his enemy, guerrilla leader Hissène Habré, to a newly created office as the first prime minister of the North African nation and as the new vice president.
- Alfredo Nobre da Costa was sworn in as the new Prime Minister of Portugal along with a nonpartisan cabinet of 17 other members, replacing the government of Mario Soares.
- Born: Deepak Rauniyar, Nepalese film director; in Saptari

== August 30, 1978 (Wednesday) ==
- In a hijacking dramatized in the book and film Judgment in Berlin, two East German citizens took control of LOT Polish Airlines Flight 165, which they had booked to return from a vacation in Poland. Flight 165 departed Gdańsk, bound for Schönefeld Airport in East Berlin, with 69 people aboard. Hans Detlef Tiede used a toy starter pistol, took a stewardess hostage and forced the flight crew to land at the U.S. Army's Tempelhof Airbase in West Berlin. All 62 passengers were offered the opportunity to remain in West Berlin or to return to the East Berlin. Tiede, his girlfriend Ingrid Ruske and Mrs. Ruske's 12-year-old daughter remained, along with seven other East Germans.
- Las Vegas Airlines Flight 44, a twin-engine Piper PA-31 Navajo chartered by a group of Australian tourists visiting the U.S., crashed on takeoff from Las Vegas, killing all nine passengers and the pilot.
- Died:
  - Geertruida Wijsmuller-Meijer, 82, Dutch resistance fighter involved in the Kindertransport that saved more than 10,000 Jewish children from Nazi-controlled territory in 1938 and 1939 before the outbreak of World War II
  - Paulette McDonagh, 77, Australian film director known for Two Minutes Silence
  - Henryk Zygalski, 70, Polish mathematician and cryptologist who assisted in solving Nazi Germany's Enigma machine ciphers

== August 31, 1978 (Thursday) ==
- Iranian-born Muslim cleric Musa al-Sadr, leader of Lebanon's Supreme Islamic Shia Council, vanished along with two aides, Abaass Bader el Dine and Sheikh Mohamad Yaacoub, six days after having traveled to Libya at the invitation of Libya's President Muammar Gaddafi. The three had purchased airline tickets to fly from Tripoli to Rome and thence to Beirut, but never boarded the flight and were not seen in public again.
- The last 139 residents of the Bikini Atoll departed their homes because of the significant amounts of radiation left over from nuclear testing, and were relocated to Kili Island. The residents had been resettled in 1946, but allowed to return starting in 1968.
- Born: Jennifer Ramírez Rivero, Venezuelan-born model and fashion entrepreneur; in San Cristóbal (murdered 2018)
