= Tom Pritchard (restaurateur) =

Manila-based restaurateur (1883–1964)

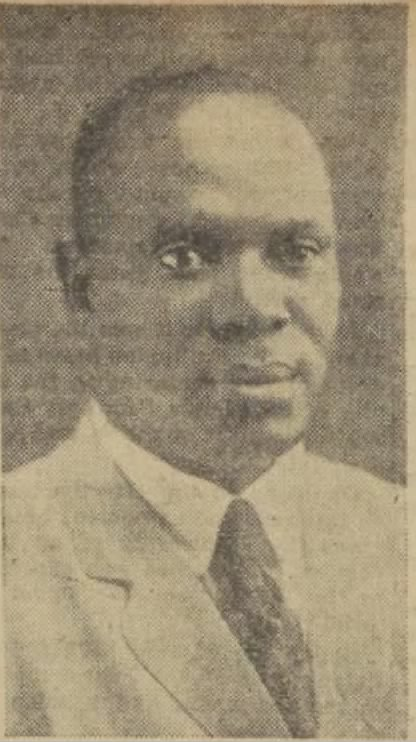
- Pritchard c. 1934
- Born: July 11, 1883; Grenada, British West Indies, British Empire
- Died: July 27, 1964 (aged 81); Manila, Philippines
- Occupations: Restaurateur; chef
- Spouse: Mary Pritchard
- Children: 3
- Military career
- Branch: U.S. Army Transport Service
- Service years: 1906–1911
- Rank: Civilian contractor
- Conflicts: Philippine–American War

Thomas Pritchard (July 11, 1883 – July 27, 1964) was an Afro-Caribbean restaurateur and chef who founded the Manila restaurant Tom's Dixie Kitchen in 1916.

Born on the island of Grenada in the British West Indies, Pritchard entered a three-year period of indentured servitude aboard a U.S. merchant ship to gain American citizenship in 1902. It is unclear if he ever received citizenship. In 1906, he joined the U.S. Army Transport Service as a cook for the American sailors supplying American soldiers fighting in the Philippine–American War. He entered the commercial restaurant business in 1911, soon founding Tom's Dixie Kitchen in Plaza Goiti (now Plaza Lascon). Pritchard sometimes falsely presented himself as being an African American (Note: The term "African American" generally refers to the descendants of Africans enslaved in the continental United States. While Pritchard was the descendant of enslaved Africans, born in the Americas, and possibly a U.S. citizen, he was not African American.) Southerner, and the restaurant was partly advertised on that premise.

Tom's Dixie Kitchen initially featured only soul food on its menu, before expanding to also offer a wide variety of food. It also featured jazz music. The restaurant saw great success and it is credited with popularizing Southern fried chicken in the Philippines. It was frequented by many Filipinos and white Americans, including by the American and Filipino elite. The restaurant became a hotbed of political discourse. In 1927, Pritchard expanded his business with the opening of another restaurant targeted at the elite, Tom's Oriental Grill. Pritchard regularly appeared in African American newspapers, which celebrated his success.

During World War II, the Empire of Japan invaded and occupied the Philippines; Pritchard was one of the few foreigners to avoid prolonged imprisonment and his restaurants were some of the few popular restaurants to remain open, although they were diminished. Various explanations have been put forward for why Pritchard avoided imprisonment. During the war, he smuggled food to foreigners imprisoned at Santo Tomas Internment Camp and provided food and funds to Filipinos and the guerrilla resistance. His restaurants were destroyed during the Battle of Manila in 1945. Pritchard's wife, Mary, was a Filipino mestiza and they had three children; after the war, Pritchard's family left the Philippines, but he decided to remain. He founded more restaurants after the war, but they saw little success. Pritchard was effectively stateless after the Philippines gained its independence in 1946. The Philippine Supreme Court voted unanimously to grant him citizenship in 1948.

== Early life ==
There are no independent accounts or documents of Pritchard's life before he arrived in the Philippines. At various points, Pritchard lied or lied by omission about various aspects of his early life. As a result of his lies and acquaintances making erroneous assumptions, various details about his origin were frequently misreported. The following account of his life before arriving in the Philippines is primarily based on sworn testimony delivered before the Philippine Supreme Court in 1948. The Philippine Supreme Court found no reason to disbelieve the testimony and accepted it as truth. It was also the primary basis of a 2018 account of his life by historian Guy Emerson Mount.

Thomas Pritchard was born on July 11, 1883, on the island of Grenada, then part of the British West Indies. His grandparents had probably been enslaved at sugar plantations until the Slavery Abolition Act 1833 abolished slavery in most of the British Empire. In his youth, Pritchard likely took part in the exploitation of nutmeg, which had largely supplanted sugar to become Grenada's primary cash crop. Pritchard and his family left Grenada in 1900, moving to Barbados. The Caribbean had recently been destabilized after the United States took Cuba and Puerto Rico from Spain in the Spanish–American War. The move to Barbados may have been the result of this destabilization, either because it displaced the family or because they sought greater access to the U.S., which Barbados had closer ties to. In 1902, an American merchant ship came to Bridgetown, Barbados. Pritchard signed a contract of indentured servitude to become a cook onboard it for three years, after which he would gain American citizenship.

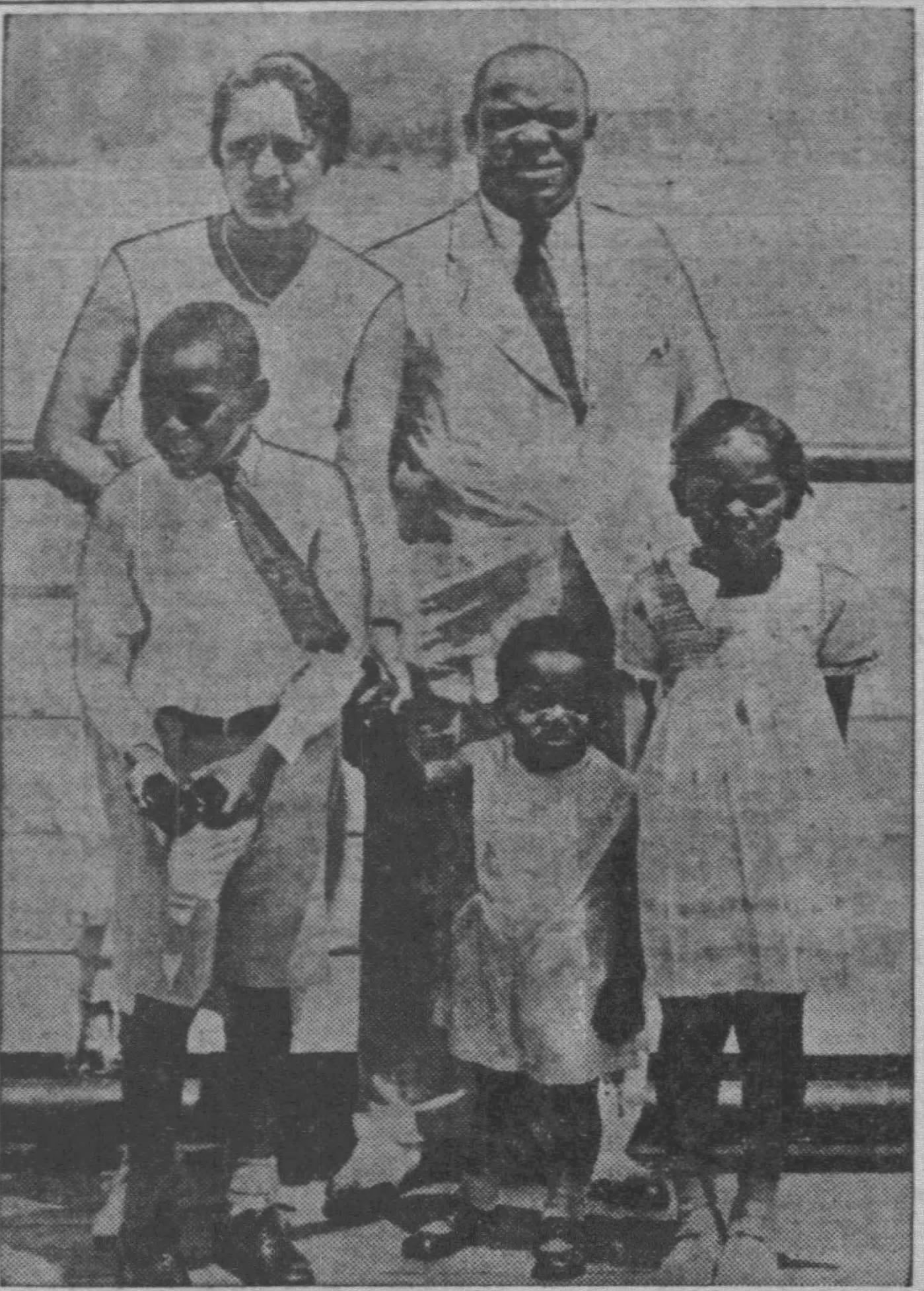
Pritchard and his family while traveling in Honolulu, May 25, 1934

The ship came to New York, where Pritchard said he filed paperwork signifying his intention to become an American citizen. He may have spent some time in Virginia. He then briefly came to San Francisco, the largest city on the U.S. Pacific Coast. In 1906, while in San Francisco, he joined the U.S. Army Transport Service as a civilian contractor. According to Pritchard, he left the paperwork proving his American citizenship in San Francisco and it was promptly destroyed in the 1906 San Francisco earthquake and fire. During the Philippine–American War, many Filipinos and American servicemen, particularly African American servicemen, suffered from malnutrition. Pritchard served as a cook on a Transport Service vessel, feeding the sailors bringing food to the American soldiers suffering from malnutrition. Pritchard later recalled that he was aboard the USAT Sheridan when it ran aground in Hawaii in August 1906. In 1911, Pritchard ended his maritime service and settled in the Philippines. After the United States had established its presence in the Philippines in the Spanish–American War, over 1,000 Black U.S. soldiers stayed on the islands. Arsenio Luz, a Filipino showman and close friend, said he met Pritchard in 1911.

Pritchard came to work at Clarke's Place on Escolta Street, in downtown Manila. Clarke's was a restaurant and ice cream parlor run by the American businessman Metcalfe A. Clarke and it was popular with Americans. The restaurant was home to a large oval table where many of Manila's leading businessmen met daily for coffee and lunch, discussing and debating politics. Pritchard was head chef at the restaurant. He proposed a "daily 'home-cooked' luncheon course", which gained him a loyal following. Clarke had provided the capital to found the Benguet Consolidated Mining Company, which included mortgaging his assets, including the restaurant. Clarke lost his investment and the restaurant was liquidated by the Bank of the Philippine Islands. The businessmen purchased the oval table they sat around at the liquidation sale.

== Tom's Dixie Kitchen ==
In 1916, Pritchard founded the restaurant Tom's Dixie Kitchen. It was located in Plaza Goiti (now Plaza Lascon), which was at the center of the city's business district and nightlife. It began as a small lunch counter. Pritchard may have gotten the funds to open it from the savings he had accumulated at sea or with the sponsorship of the businessmen who frequented Clarke's. The restaurant was open 24 hours a day every day. Pritchard later recalled that for the first two years of operation he only had two assistants and did all the cooking himself. The business eventually became successful. Pritchard used a rigid accounting method to prevent workers from defrauding him. As indicated by the restaurant's name, (Note: Dixie is a nickname for the Southern United States.) Pritchard sometimes falsely presented himself as being African American. Some people were aware of his true origins in the Caribbean, probably because of his accent, but they came to the mistaken conclusion that he was Jamaican.

The round table that existed at Clarke's moved into Tom's Dixie Kitchen, for a time. Tom's Dixie Kitchen became known for its own round table. One humorous essay in Philippine Magazine pointed to the existence of two "world centers of learning and culture" in Manila: the University of the Philippines's library and the round table at Tom's Dixie Kitchen. A. V. H. Hartendorp, a Thomasite and newspaper owner, recalled that there were various round tables reserved for various groups, such as bureaucrats, legislators, businessmen, actors, and one for sportswriters and sports-fans. At the round tables, a diverse spectrum of people at every hour of the day debated and discussed a wide variety of petty and significant issues.

Pritchard incorporated his business c. 1921 as Tom's Dixie Kitchen, Inc for ₱175 (equivalent to about ₱53,366 in 2021). He was its principal stockholder and president of the company's board. Jesus Barrera, later an associate justice of the Philippine Supreme Court, was also a stockholder and served on the board. Pritchard also employed two African American assistants c. 1921, Chester Canders and Philip McCullough, both veterans of World War I.

In 1921, boxing manager Frank A. Churchill was sitting at a round table and predicted that a Filipino would one day become boxing world champion. The sportswriters, sports fans, and businessmen present laughed and ridiculed the idea. Reportedly desiring the respect of the influential diners, Churchill soon helped the Filipino boxer Pancho Villa travel to the United States, where he would become the world flyweight champion. It has been suggested that, if Churchill had not sat at the round table in Pritchard's restaurant, Pancho Villa would not have become world champion and boxing in the Philippines would not have become popular. Pritchard would later promote boxing through his restaurant, selling tickets to bouts, and he probably helped facilitate a post-war visit to the Philippines by Joe Louis.

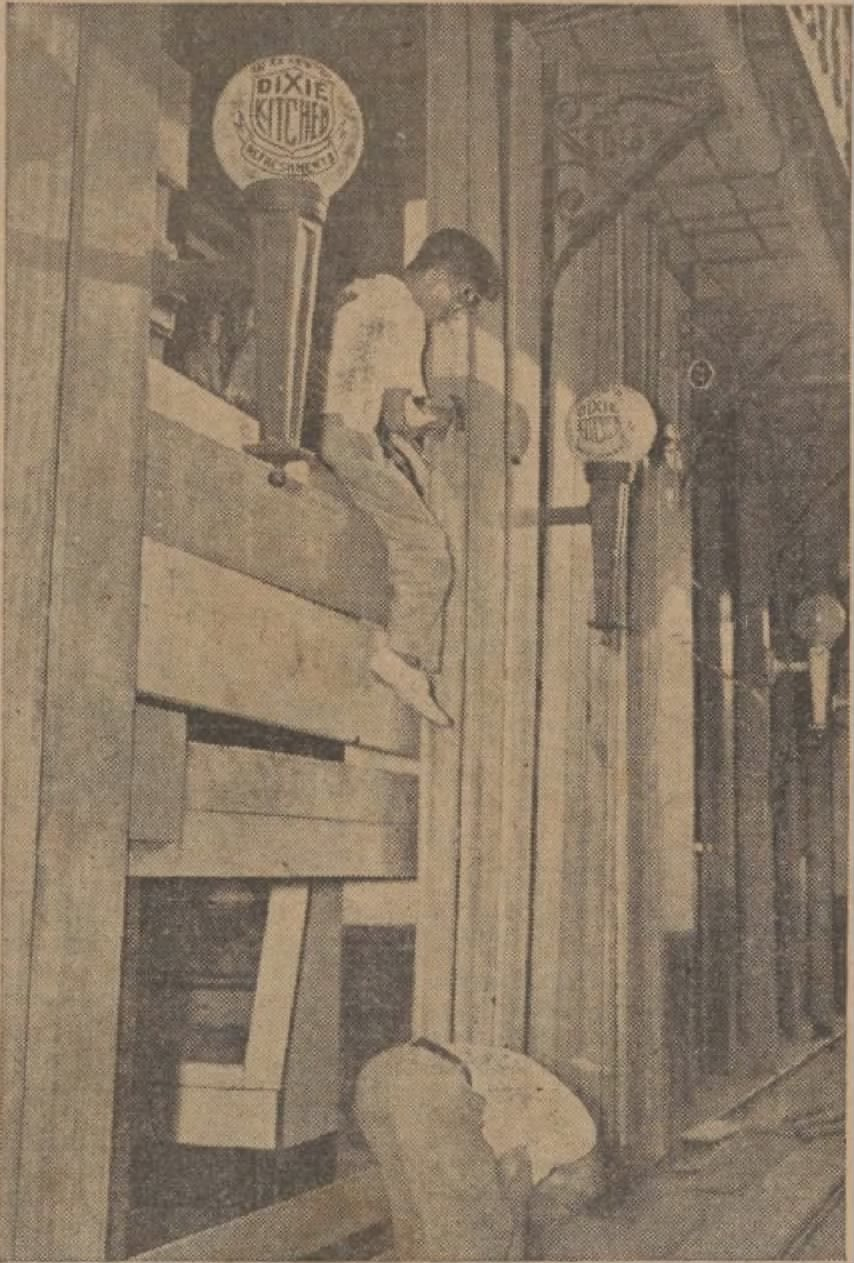
Tom's Dixie Kitchen on May 10, 1941, the first day it closed

The restaurant expanded to take over nearly the whole block it was on, which Pritchard said occurred in 1926. In 1928, Pritchard said he had 12 cooks, 40 waiters, and 1,200 average daily customers. The restaurant was at the height of its popularity during the pre-war Philippine Commonwealth and gold boom. On May 10, 1941, for the first moment in its 25 years of operation 24 hours a day every day, Tom's Dixie Kitchen shut down. Earlier in the day, 50 waiters at the restaurant started a sitdown strike. Pritchard shut down the restaurant, which the strikers characterized as a lockout and sought an order to reopen the restaurant; Pritchard said that he shut it down because business was poor. The waiters said the strike was in protest to what they saw as abuses by C. Hendricks, the manager. Pritchard said it was because he had fired two waiters and that it was instigated by an ex-employee he had fired years prior.

=== Menu and atmosphere ===
Tom's Dixie Kitchen initially offered soul food, the ethnic cuisine of African Americans. Pritchard was probably able to make passable soul food from experience gained from cooking at sea or from visiting American ports. Hartendorp attributed the restaurant's popularity to the soul food it served. The restaurant popularized Southern fried chicken in the Philippines. The restaurant's menu diversified from the soul food that was originally its exclusive purview. It expanded to serve food from a wide variety of places, such as Wales, Mexico, France, the Philippines, the Caribbean, and China. It also served processed food originating from the United States, such as Grape-Nuts, shredded wheat, and corn flakes. The restaurant offered sugary desserts, such as pumpkin pie, chocolate éclairs, ice cream, and milk shakes. Despite being a colony of the United States, the Philippines was not under prohibition and Tom's Dixie Kitchen sold alcohol. It offered a wide variety of alcohol, such as Holland gin fizz, French rum, German goldwasser, Japanese beer, Italian wines, Australian wines, Canadian whisky, and Irish scotch.

Tom's Dixie Kitchen featured jazz music. At his dance floor, African-American dance was frequently performed to jazz. The restaurant had an orchestra. It probably contained multiple African American musicians, with some probably being trained by Pritchard's friend Walter Loving. The orchestra was also broadcast on the radio.

=== Clientele ===
Tom's Dixie Kitchen attracted a diverse clientele from colonial Filipino society. Many white Americans were attracted to the restaurant by it and Pritchard's African American-ness, which would have felt familiar to the United States in the faraway Philippines. Filipino diners, unfamiliar with and intrigued by soul food, also came to the restaurant. The restaurant sold meals at a cheap price, with Hartendorp recalling that a standard lunch only cost 1 peso. Pritchard advertised the restaurant as "where new comers and old timers get together", and issued targeted advertisements at disparate groups, such as American serviceman and rural Filipinos. Filipino author Nick Joaquin recalled Tom's Dixie Kitchen as being frequented by both Easterners and Westerners, while noting that they sat at different tables.

Tom's Dixie Kitchen also catered. He was the preferred caterer of various elite clubs, such as the Manila Jockey, Manila Army and Navy, and Manila Polo Clubs.

=== Tom's Oriental Grill ===
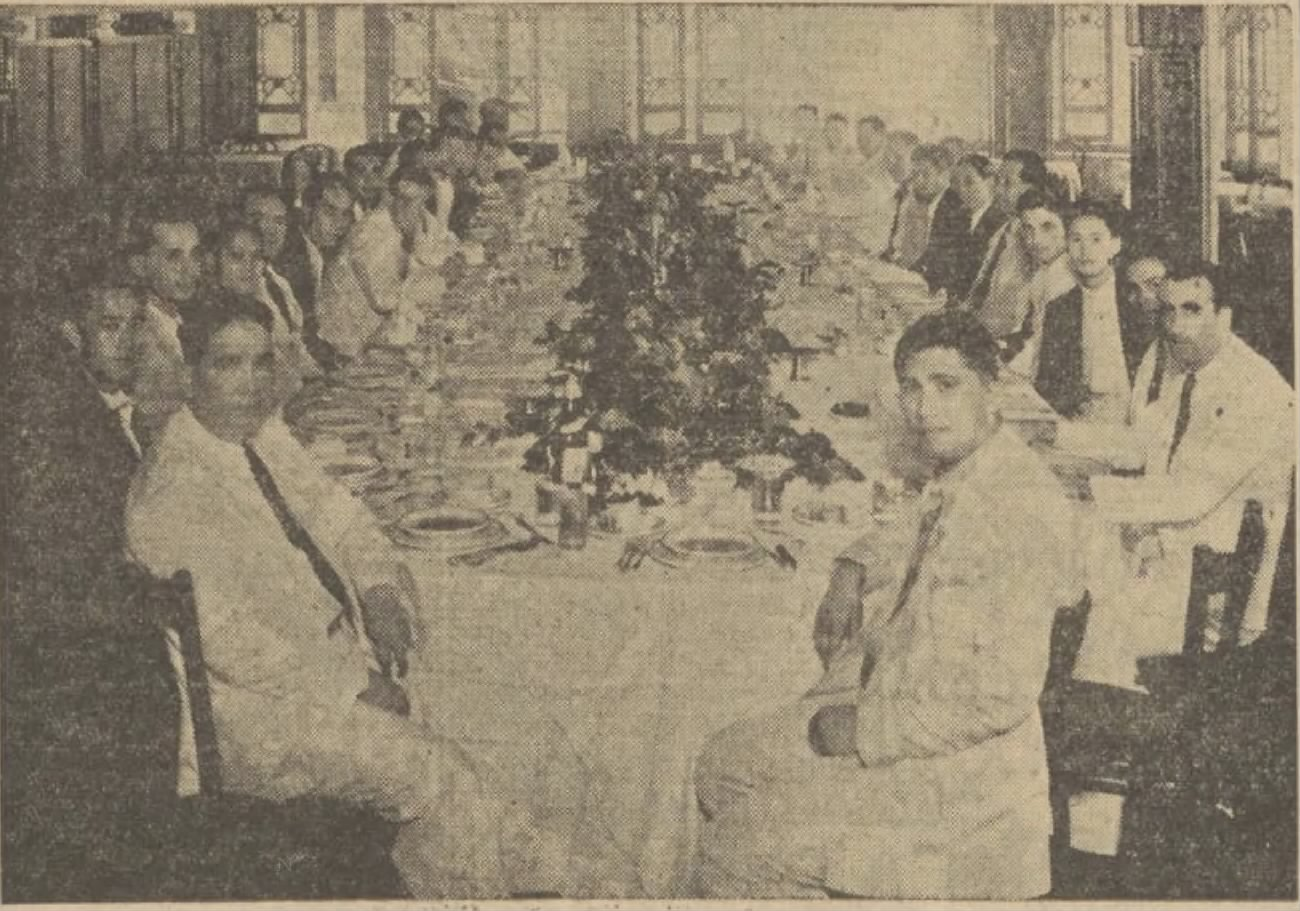
Luncheon at Tom's Oriental Grill on May 10, 1937

In November 1927, Pritchard expanded his business with the opening of Tom's Oriental Grill, a restaurant and nightclub above Tom's Dixie Kitchen. It was targeted at the elite and featured a wide variety of rooms themed on Asian locales. The Filipino and Chinese mestizo elite saw themselves as more cultured than the American elite, which Pritchard reciprocated by putting an Asian-themed restaurant above his American-themed restaurant. Hartendorp recalled the restaurant as being more for private dinners and large parties. The rooms were themed around Singapore, Siam (Thailand), Java (an island in Indonesia), Turkey, the Philippine district of Cebu, and the Philippine district of Iloilo. Pritchard had furniture and various decals in the rooms imported from various countries. The restaurant also featured a "'Devil's' room" that was clad in "passionate red" and probably catered to the sex trade. One reviewer observed that the only thing Western in the restaurant was the jazz music.

The restaurant appears to have had a partially segregated workforce with Filipino ushers and Chinese mestizo waiters. The strike that shut down Tom's Dixie Kitchen in May 1941 did not extend to Tom's Oriental Grill. Pritchard said he would shut it down in the event of a sympathy strike, especially since business had been poor after a 1 am curfew was implemented.

=== Political hotbed ===
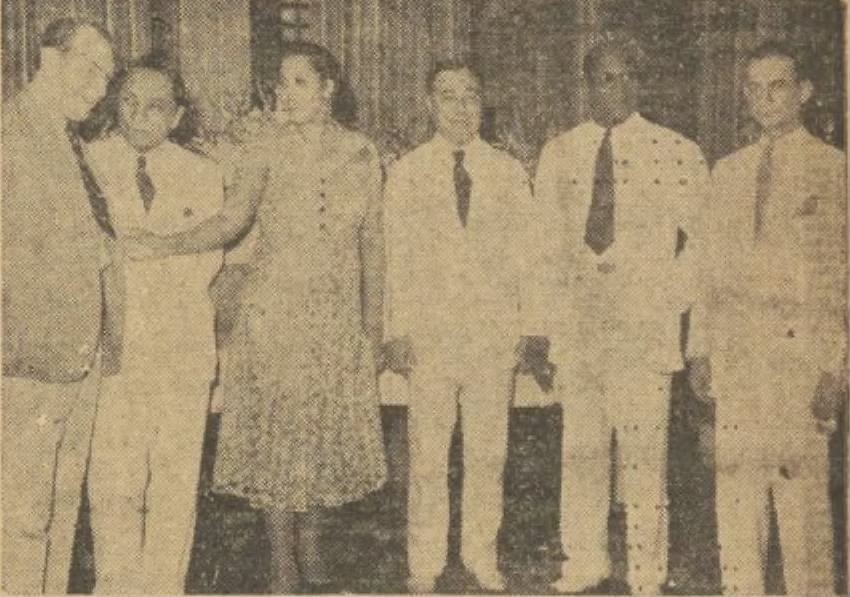
A birthday celebration for Pritchard's wife Mary. From left to right: newspaper editor F. Theo Rogers, Resident Commissioner Quintín Paredes, Mary, Governor Buenaventura Rodriguez, Pritchard, and Representative Francisco Varona.

Tom's Dixie Kitchen was a go-to venue for Filipinos to learn about the culture and politics of Americans. One newspaper described Tom's Dixie Kitchen as the place elites go to for "indescribably good chow, and, incidentally, to solve the leading issues of the day." At least one incident of political violence occurred at Tom's Dixie Kitchen. In 1926, after one American patron declared his support for Filipino independence, another assaulted them into the hospital. In a December 1935 diary entry, former Governor-General Francis Burton Harrison, an advisor to President Manuel L. Quezon, wrote that Quezon said he was informed of the political goings-on because he had three agents at Tom's Dixie Kitchen. It is not clear what Pritchard did, if anything, with his influence among the American elite.

Public figures gathered at Tom's Dixie Kitchen to discuss politics in hourlong debates that were often lively. After visiting the restaurant, journalists frequently immediately returned to their offices to write articles. Journalist Frederic Sylvester Marquardt remembered Tom's Dixie Kitchen as a good place to learn recent political news. Filipino writer Paz Márquez-Benítez asked Pritchard's approximation of public opinion on Philippine independence and dominionhood, as he was considered well-informed about politics and in touch with diverse portions of Filipino society. In a 1934 interview with The Honolulu Advertiser, Pritchard declined to comment on the issue of Philippine independence. Hartendorp recalled that a letter from outside the Philippines addressed to Frank Carpenter, a frequent customer and the governor of Mindanao and Sulu, was addressed to Tom's Dixie Kitchen without any further information on the address and successfully delivered.

=== Reception ===
Tom's Dixie Kitchen was often featured in travel guides for visiting Manila. Many high-end foreign restaurants were featured in such guides; they did not feature restaurants serving Filipino food and often cautioned against visiting them. During Congressional hearings on independence, his restaurant was cited as an argument for the Philippines being capable of self-governance. Historian Guy Emerson Mount, who authored a biography of Pritchard in his PhD thesis, called Tom's Dixie Kitchen Manila's version of Paris's Café de Flore. He also suggested that his restaurant may have been "the first attempt in human history at an Afro-Asian fusion cuisine".

==== By African Americans ====
Pritchard and news of his success frequently appeared in African American newspapers and he became a folk hero. The newspapers sometimes recounted his false American origin, placing a young Pritchard in a sailing ship in Alabama or as a cook from Virginia, with one declaring that Pritchard "remembered always that he was an American Negro". The newspapers sometimes exaggerated the success of the restaurants. John L. Waller Jr., son of John L. Waller, writing in the Pittsburgh Courier and reporting from Manila after Tom's Oriental Grill opened, declared "The Negroes of America will be as proud to read of his great triumph as those in Manila were to witness it and mingle with the great crowd that turned out to honor him". Nahum Daniel Brascher of The Chicago Defender, writing in 1938, would note Pritchard's "homes (yes plural)" and his willingness to hire more people. John F. Cragwell, an African American man visiting Manila who stayed with Pritchard, Loving, and James Henry Fitzbutler (son of William Henry Fitzbutler), wrote an article on their success in the Seattle Enterprise, and it was further syndicated to the Topeka Plaindealer. Pritchard's establishments were favorably compared to Rector's, The College Inn, and the Cotton Club, the last being one of the central locations of the Harlem Renaissance. Ahead of a planned expansion of Tom's Dixie Kitchen in 1945, Billy Rowe of the Courier declared that it would be "a monument to the ingenuity of the American Negro". Rowe attributed Pritchard's success to "a fury of authentic greatness" and called him "a man with a rendezvous with destiny", saying that he was a male Josephine Baker, referencing the pioneering African American performer.

== World War II ==
In December 1941, the Empire of Japan invaded and occupied the Philippines. In January 1942, more than 200 African Americans and their families were detained and interrogated by the Japanese; Pritchard and his family were among those detained. Many were classified as enemy nationals, alongside other foreigners. Santo Tomas Internment Camp (STIC) held over 3,800 men, women, and children. At least 50 "American Negros" were recorded as prisoners at STIC in November 1944. Pritchard and his family avoided imprisonment. Pritchard's friends provided multiple explanations for why the Japanese released him: Hartendorp thought that it was because he was born in Jamaica (Note: He was not. Jamaica was also part of the British West Indies. Some people were aware of his true origins in the Caribbean, probably because of his accent, but they mistakenly assumed he was Jamaican.) and a naturalized Philippine citizen, (Note: He was not. See § Thomas Pritchard v. The Republic of the Philippines) General Charles A. Willoughby guessed it was because of his Southern cooking and "the old smoothy's disarming ways", and Luz observed that "the Japanese were most sympathetic with American colored people because they knew the racial antagonism that existed between the whites and the colored". Later researchers have suggested that it was because Pritchard was friends with Quezon and other Filipino elites and was able to convince the Japanese of his neutrality or, in the event none of the prior were true, because he was otherwise able to convince the Japanese that he and his family were ordinary Filipinos. When asked why, Pritchard said "I never knew whether or not the Ambassador told them to forget about me and I had better sense than to ask questions."

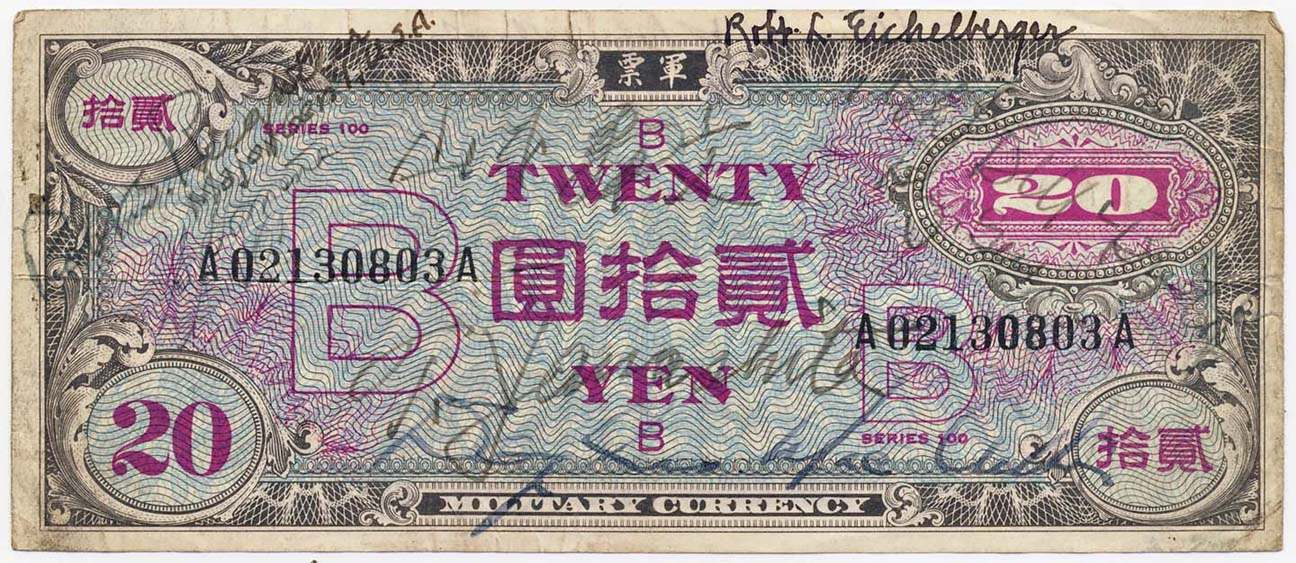
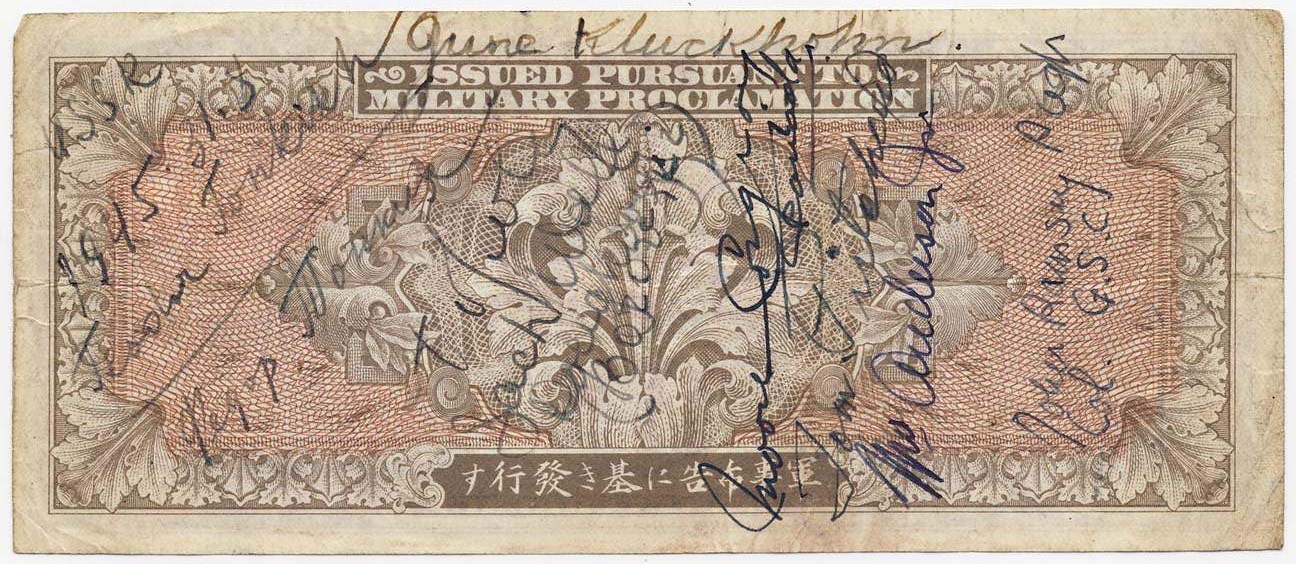
The obverse and reverse of a 20 yen B yen, a military currency used in occupied Japan. Various signatures are written on it, including those of Pritchard (third from right on the reverse), diplomat Lawrence Moore Cosgrave, General John R. Pugh, General Robert S. Beightler, General Robert L. Eichelberger, General Tomoyuki Yamashita, President Sergio Osmeña, and Supreme Commander for the Allied Powers Douglas MacArthur.

Tom's Dixie Kitchen was one of the few popular restaurants to remain open, although its menu variety and quality suffered greatly, while its prices increased dramatically. Hartendorp said that a meal at Tom's Dixie Kitchen cost 75 pesos and was a fourth as big as it was pre-war. (Note: This was not based on his personal experience, as Hartendorp spent the war imprisoned at STIC.) Pritchard recalled that Japanese authorities came to his home twice to arrest him, but he was not there and they had left by the time he returned, with Pritchard saying an unknown person had called them off. He also said that, after being paid with their Mickey Mouse money, he "turned it into something useful". Hartendorp recalled that Pritchard was interrogated by Japanese authorities for several hours at Fort Santiago after he sent food to F. Theo Rogers, an imprisoned newspaper editor. He also recalled that Pritchard had smuggled food to internees at STIC and sent a large amount of funds to the Philippine resistance. Charles H. Loeb, war correspondent for the National Negro Publishers Association, interviewed Filipinos who stressed that Pritchard was not a collaborationist and that he had fed, sheltered, and given money to many Filipinos during the occupation. Robert Gordon Woods, an African American soldier who had held senior positions in the Philippine Constabulary, recovered from a prolonged imprisonment at Los Baños Internment Camp while staying at Pritchard's house.

Pritchard said that his restaurants remained open until American forces under the command of General Douglas MacArthur returned to the city. During the Battle of Manila in 1945, when American and Japanese forces engaged in fierce combat, the building housing Tom's Dixie Kitchen and Tom's Oriental Grill was destroyed. Initial reports indicated it may have been burned by retreating Japanese forces. However, American artillery, tank power, and air power were indiscriminate and bombed large portions of the city, possibly destroying the building. Pritchard's mansion in the Santa Mesa neighborhood of Manila survived the battle. Standing on the ruins of Tom's Dixie Kitchen, Pritchard declared "I'll rebuild it. But this time, finer than ever."

== Thomas Pritchard v. The Republic of the Philippines ==
On July 4, 1946, the Philippines gained its independence from the United States. As a result of his application to become an American citizen, Pritchard had probably forfeited his status as a British subject under the British Nationality and Status of Aliens Act 1914. It is unclear if Pritchard immediately gained American citizenship once the criteria in his application had been met, or if he was required to do more paperwork. Regardless, Pritchard did not have the application or any proof that he had met the criteria. When Pritchard came to the Philippines, there were effectively no immigration controls and so his effective statelessness did not matter. To become a naturalized citizen of the Philippines after 1939, a person was required to show the permanent resident alien form given when a person came to the Philippines; such a form did not exist when Pritchard came to the Philippines in 1911. As a result of the Philippines gaining its independence, Pritchard's statelessness was now relevant and he effectively became an illegal alien.

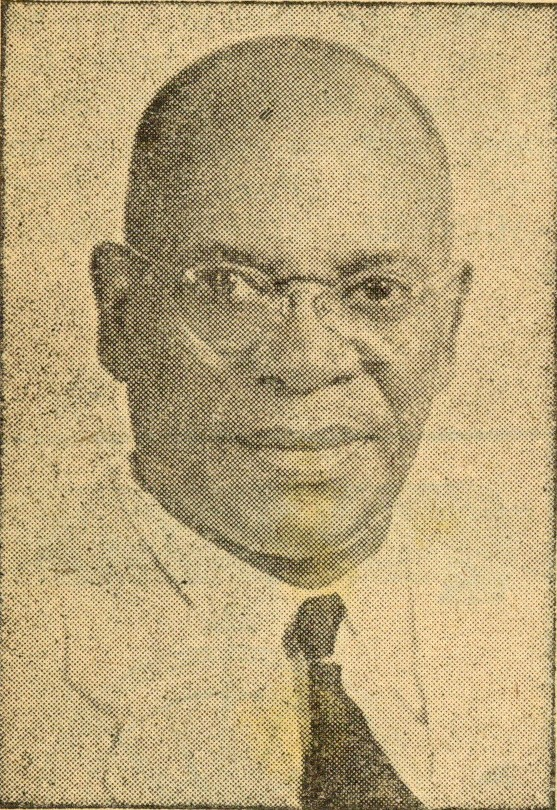
Pritchard c. 1949

On January 22, 1947, Pritchard filed a naturalization petition in the Court of First Instance in Manila. His petition faced no opposition. On August 29, 1947, after taking evidence, the court granted Pritchard's application. On September 27, 1947, the Philippine Solicitor General appealed, and the case was remanded to the Philippine Supreme Court. It is not known why the solicitor general appealed. It was one of the first cases dealing with Philippine citizenship to come before the high court after independence. Pritchard's attorney was Quintín Paredes and in the ensuing trial Pritchard delivered testimony to prove his suitability for citizenship, with three friends providing corroborating testimony: Felixberto G. Bustos, Victor Buencamino, and Arsenio Luz.

Bustos, a journalist and ally of President Manuel Roxas, focused his testimony on arguing that Pritchard hired many Filipinos at his restaurant and had been fair in the workplace. He also said that Pritchard was respected by everybody, "despite his race", and a "legitimate democratic person". Buencamino, who was probably in business with Pritchard, testified that Pritchard was not an anarchist, polygamist, proponent of political violence, guilty of moral turpitude, and that his conduct to Filipinos and the Philippine government was good. Luz, a close friend and showman, testified that Pritchard was friends with much of the Filipino elite, including Roxas, friendly with Filipinos, desired to be a Filipino, and recounted his experience in World War II. His appeal to Pritchard's friendship with the elite was a common way to overcome strict interpretation of the law and his statement of Pritchard desiring to be a Filipino was nearly identical to a legal requirement. Pritchard testified next, recounting his life, including his complicated citizenship status, declaring his support for the separation of church and state, and declaring that he was not a communist. Pritchard said he desired to remain in the country as all his friends were in it, also putting forward his ability to read and write English and his partial fluency of Spanish and Tagalog. Pritchard also talked about his family, which was an important consideration under the law: his wife Mary Beatty Pritchard was a fair-skinned Filipino mestiza born in Iloilo and they had three children together: Thomas Jr. (born January 10, 1925), Rosemary (born c. 1928), and William (born September 17, 1932). Pritchard testified that his children had been educated in Philippine schools, a legal requirement.

The solicitor general did not contest the factuality of the statements made by Pritchard and his friends. He had three objections to his naturalization request; first was that Pritchard's children had attended Philippine schools but they had not completed their education at them. The court rejected this argument as "based on an interpretation of the law not only too literal but unreasonable". He next objected that Pritchard's children had not been educated during his entire residence on the Philippines, as they had fled the Philippines during World War II. The court also rejected this argument, finding that the reading of the law it required, namely that Pritchard should have had his children educated for the entire 37 years he resided in the country, including the 14 years before his eldest child was born, was absurd and attributing it to a clerical error or oversight. His final objection was that Pritchard was not an American citizen, as he had no documentary proof of it and that the citizenship, if it existed, was not complete and only applied while he was employed at sea. The court found that no documentary evidence was required as Pritchard's claim to citizenship was unexceptional, and that, even if his citizenship was incomplete, such a status was inconsequential, as "[i]t is elemental that not all the citizens of a country enjoy all the rights and privileges of a citizen". On July 17, 1948, the Philippine Supreme Court voted unanimously to grant Pritchard citizenship.

== Later life ==
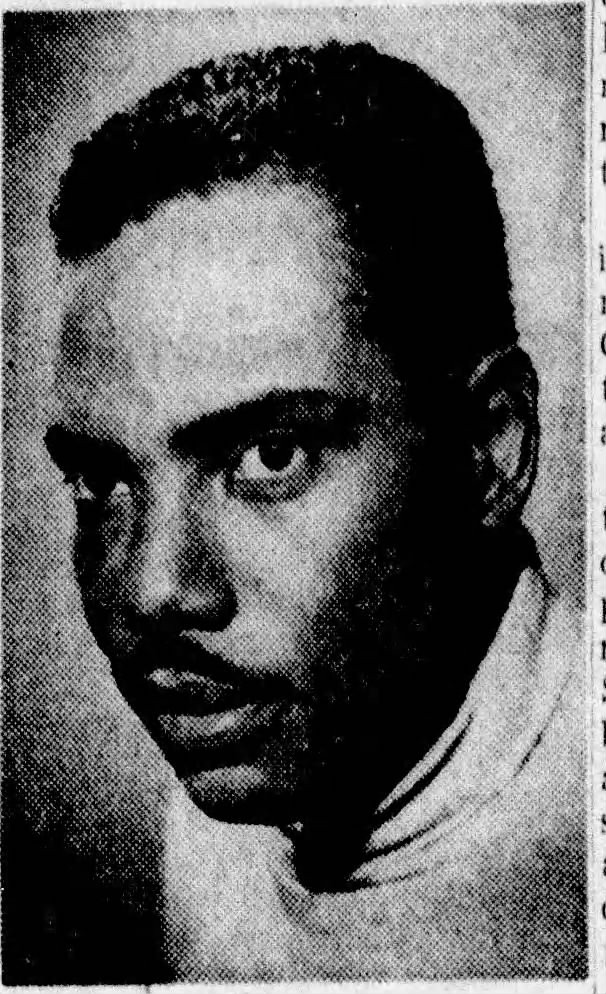
Thomas Jr.

In May 1945, shell-shocked and shaken by the war, Pritchard's family left the Philippines and moved to California, where his children planned to complete their education. Pritchard decided to stay in the Philippines. Thomas Jr. attended Oakland Technical High School, the University of California, and the California College of Arts and Crafts. He served an eighteen-month tour with the U.S. Army in the Korean War. He also held a pilot's license and was a member of the Aircraft Owners and Pilots Association and Civil Air Patrol. On January 3, 1953, Thomas Jr. was flying a plane with a friend when it crashed into the Lafayette Reservoir, killing them both. William attended San Francisco State College. Rosemary married Ralph Bradley in Berkeley, California, in 1948; the wedding was reported on by the Pittsburgh Courier, and she later moved to Massachusetts. In 1949, Pritchard visited the United States by way of a trans-Pacific cruise aboard the SS President Cleveland. During a stop in Tokyo, Pritchard wired MacArthur, then Supreme Commander for the Allied Powers supervising the rebuilding of occupied Japan, and asked to speak with him. MacArthur arranged a private car to pick up Pritchard, and Pritchard recalled that they talked about Luz, Rogers, and other friends in the Philippines.

In May 1945, Pritchard opened a new restaurant in his home, Tom's Club Cabin. After Hartendorp was released from STIC, he recalled hiking to Tom's Dixie Kitchen only to find a "cheap honky-tonk" built on its ruins. In Pritchard's obituary, his friend Frank S. Tenny recalled that he had been "practically broke" after the war. A 1975 article in Black Enterprise said he lost all his money buying arms for the guerrilla resistance. On January 17, 1953, Pritchard opened a new restaurant and cocktail lounge, Tom's Log Cabin, which had the same menu as Tom's Dixie Kitchen. It was located in Pasay City, along Lourdes Street and Dewey Boulevard (now Roxas Boulevard). Pritchard founded another restaurant, Tom's Mango Terrace. Hartendorp recalled that Pritchard later went into business with Whitey Smith at Town's Tavern, located in Manila on Isaac Peral Street (now United Nations Avenue). Hartendorp concluded that, after the war, Manila had decentralized and Pritchard's restaurants were not successful as they were out of the way. Pritchard died in Manila on July 27, 1964, at the age of 81, from type 2 diabetes. Mary returned to the Philippines to attend his funeral and said that he had made no mention of any illness in their last correspondence.

== See also ==
- Jollibee, a Philippine fast-food restaurant best known for its fried chicken, a dish Pritchard popularized in the Philippines

== Bibliography ==
- Mount, Guy Emerson (June 2018). "Soul Food, Stir Fry, and Citizenship: The Transnational Construction of Tom's Dixie Kitchen in Manila". The Last Reconstruction: Slavery, Emancipation, and Empire in the Black Pacific (PDF) (PhD thesis). University of Chicago. pp. 205–255. Archived from the original on July 11, 2024.
