= September 1978 =

Month of 1978

<<	September 1978					>>
Su	Mo	Tu	We	Th	Fr	Sa
					1	2
3	4	5	6	7	8	9
10	11	12	13	14	15	16
17	18	19	20	21	22	23
24	25	26	27	28	29	30

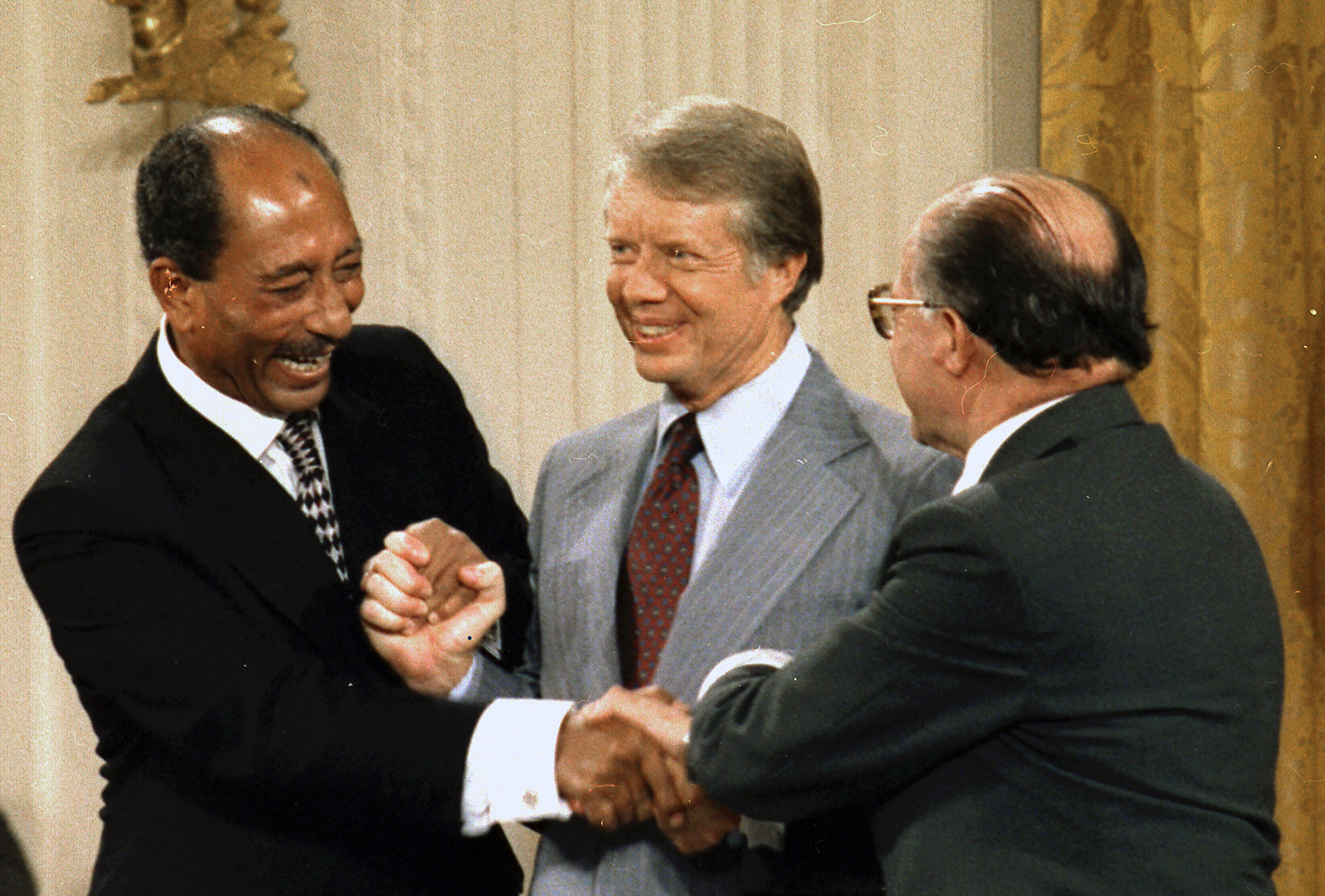
September 17, 1978: Egypt's President Anwar Sadat, U.S. President Jimmy Carter, and Israeli Prime Minister Menachem Begin conclude Middle East peace agreement after negotiations at Camp David U.S. presidential retreat

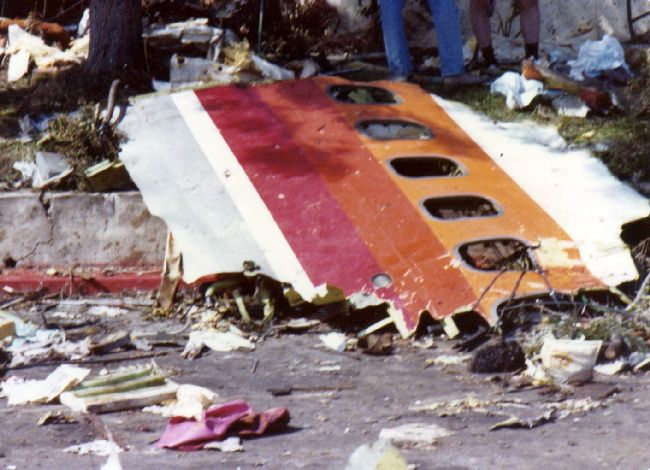
September 25, 1978: Crash of PSA Flight 182 kills 144 people in San Diego

The following events occurred in September 1978:

== September 1, 1978 (Friday) ==
- Home Theater Network (HTN), the second pay television film channel in the U.S., premiered as a lower-priced ($3.75 per month) competitor to the existing Home Box Office (HBO). Initially shown on New England Cablevision in Portland, Maine, and on for four hours a day, HTN limited its telecasts to films with a "G" or "PG" rating. Unable to increase its viewership sufficiently to meet its expenses, HTN would continue until its shutdown on January 31, 1987.
- The Speedway bombings, random explosions of homemade bombs, began in the Indianapolis suburb of Speedway, Indiana, at 9:50 in the evening with a blast from inside a trash container outside the Hi-Fi Buys store in the Speedway Shopping Center, where windows and a car windshield were shattered, followed 10 minutes later by one in a dumpster behind the Speedway motel and a third at 10:45 in a residential neighborhood.
- Born: Adam Yahiye Gadahn, American-born terrorist member of al-Qaeda; as Adam Pearlman in rural Oregon (killed in drone strike, 2015)

== September 2, 1978 (Saturday) ==
- The crash of an Airwest Airlines twin-engine Otter airplane killed 11 of the 13 people on board after plunging into the harbor while attempting to land on Vancouver Island in Canada. All of the passengers were Japanese tourists. The airplane broke into two on impact, floated briefly, and then sank in 13 feet (4.0 m) of water.
- Somerset County defeated Sussex County to win the Gillette Cup, the annual knockout tournament championship of first-class cricket in England, played at Lord's in London.
- College football in the U.S. opened with a new level, Division I-AA, consisting of eight lower-level teams from the former Division I (Bucknell, Florida A&M, Lafayette, Lehigh, Nevada, Northeastern, Northwestern State, and Portland State) and the formerly Division I Southwestern Athletic Conference (SWAC), and 35 of the better teams from Division II's Big Sky Conference, Mid-Eastern Athletic Conference (MEAC), Ohio Valley Conference, and the Yankee Conference (now defunct).
- Died:
  - Fred G. Meyer, 92, German-born American grocery store entrepreneur and founder of the Fred Meyer store chain
  - Charles F. Blair Jr., 69, pioneering American aviator, military officer in the U.S. Navy and the U.S. Air Force, founder and owner of the Antilles Air Boats commuter airline, was killed in the crash of Antilles Air Boats Flight 941, along with three of his 10 passengers.

== September 3, 1978 (Sunday) ==
- Air Rhodesia Flight 825, with 52 passengers and four crew, was shot down by missile fired by the Zimbabwe People's Revolutionary Army (ZIPRA) after taking off from the resort of Victoria Falls to Salisbury in Rhodesia (now Zimbabwe. Of the 56 people on board, 38 were killed immediately when the Vickers Viscount impacted near the town of Karoi. The ZIPRA guerrillas then hunted the 18 survivors and killed 10 of them. The other eight had managed to escape the ZIPRA terrorists' attention.
- The crash of an Air Guinee flight to the Guinean capital of Conakry killed 15 of the 17 people on board. The Ilyushin Il-18 was approaching Conakry at the end of a flight from Moscow in the Soviet Union.

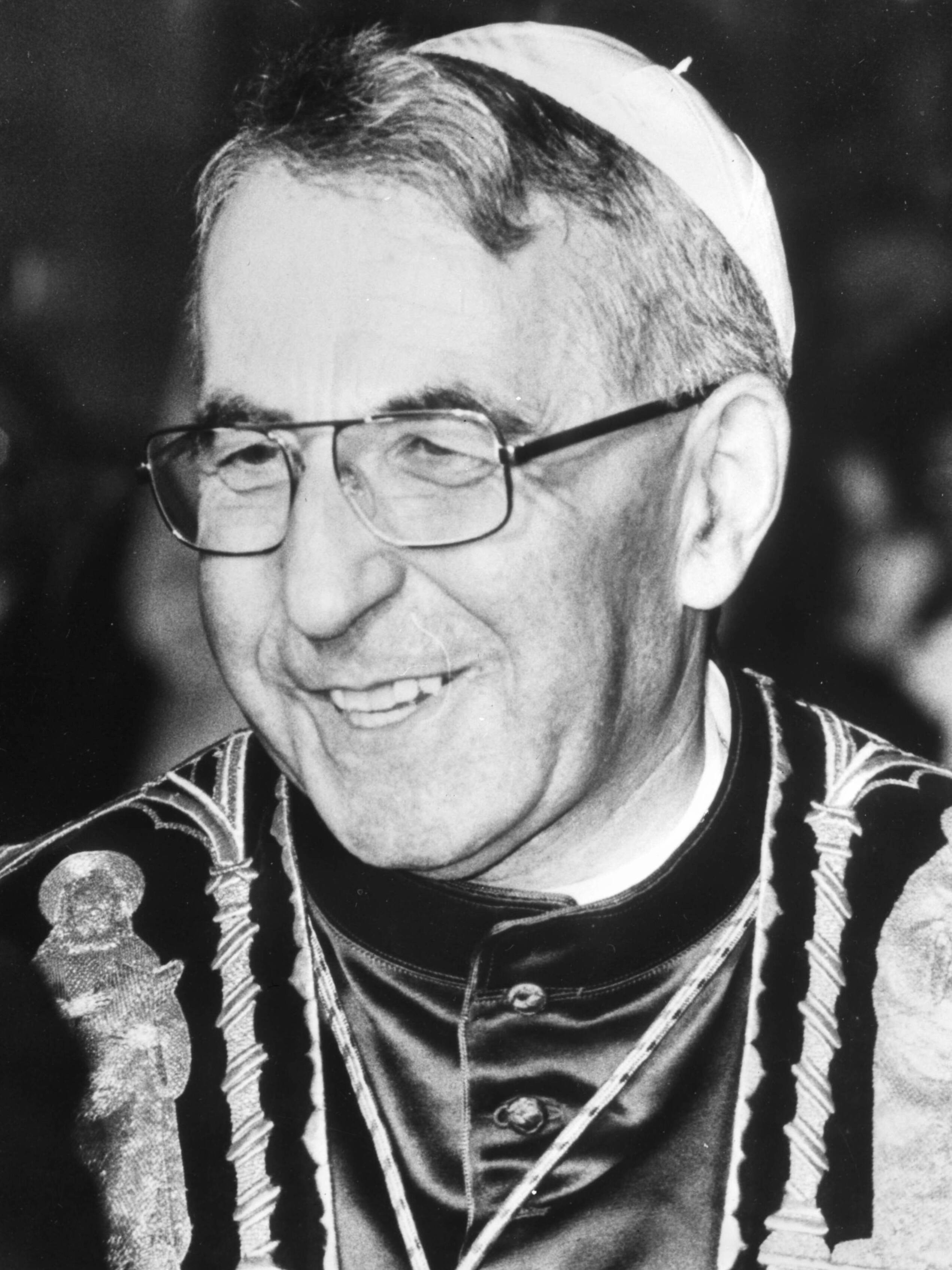
Pope John Paul II

- Pope John Paul I was formally installed as the 263rd pontiff of the Roman Catholic Church, with ceremonies taking place at St. Peter's Square in Rome before a crowd of 250,000 people, and an estimated one billion television viewers worldwide.
- Kilkenny GAA won the championship of Ireland's National Hurling League at Croke Park in Dublin, defeating defending champion Cork GAA, 1-15 to 2-8 (equivalent to 18 to 14).
- Mountaineers Glenn Woodsworth and Carol Evenchick became the first persons to climb to the top of Canada's Tsaydaychuz Peak, a 9,049-foot (2,758 m) mountain in the Pattullo Range of the Hazelton Mountains in British Columbia.
- Born: Carmen Amariei, Romanian team handball player with 182 appearances for the Romanian women's team; in Cluj Napoca
- Died: Karin Molander, 89, Swedish film actress

== September 4, 1978 (Monday) ==
- Anna University was established in India at Madras (now Chennai) and named in honor of C. N. Annadurai, who had been the Chief Minister of Madras State and Tamil Nadu until his death from cancer in 1969.
- The wreckage of the American paddle steamer boat Phoenix was discovered in New York's Lake Champlain exactly 159 years after her sinking on September 4, 1819.
- Seven people were killed at a Labor Day festival in the U.S. town of Derry, Pennsylvania, and 13 seriously injured, when a Hughes 269-C helicopter stalled while flying at low altitude over the parking lot of the St. Joseph's Church.
- Born: Wes Bentley, American film and TV actor known for American Beauty; in Jonesboro, Arkansas
- Died: Leonora Cohen, 105, English suffragette and women's rights activist

== September 5, 1978 (Tuesday) ==
- Hosted by U.S. President Jimmy Carter, Israel's Prime Minister Menachem Begin and Egypt's President Anwar Sadat opened discussions on a treaty at the U.S. presidential retreat at Camp David in Maryland.
- The only "open university" in Thailand, Sukhothai Thammathirat Open University (STOU) was created. It would begin classes on December 1, 1980.
- U.S. Congressman Daniel Flood, who had represented his district in Pennsylvania for 27 years, was indicted by a federal grand jury on three counts of perjury on charges of lying about receiving illegal payoffs from persons benefiting from legislation that he had sponsored. Although re-elected in November, Flood would resign halfway through his term in January 1980.
- Born: Chris Hipkins, 41st Prime Minister of New Zealand from January to November, 2023; in Hutt Valley
- Died:
  - Nikodim Rotov, 48, Russian Orthodox Church archbishop and the Metropolitan of Leningrad and Novgorod, collapsed and died of a heart attack while at a papal audience with Pope John Paul I.
  - Joe Negroni, 37, American rock and roll singer, died of a cerebral hemorrhage.
  - Joe Glick, 75, American boxer and former world welterweight champion

== September 6, 1978 (Wednesday) ==
- In the U.S., scientists at the City of Hope National Medical Center in Duarte, California, announced that they had been able to make "a biological carbon copy of the molecule for the human insulin hormone and possibly be able to mass produce insulin for treatment of persons with diabetes.
- Born:
  - Homare Sawa, Japanese footballer with 205 caps for the Japan women's national team; in Fuchū, Tokyo
  - Mathew Horne, English comedian and TV actor known for Gavin & Stacey; in Burton Joyce, Nottinghamshire
- Died:
  - Adolf "Adi" Dassler, 77, German cobbler, inventor and entrepreneur who founded the athletic shoe and sportswear company Adidas
  - Willi-Peter Stoll, 28, West German terrorist with the Red Army Faction, suspected of direct involvement in the kidnapping and murder of Hanns Martin Schleyer, was shot to death after police in Düsseldorf spotted him at the Shanghai Chinese Restaurant. Stoll pulled a pistol when asked for his identification and was shot at the scene.

== September 7, 1978 (Thursday) ==
- Bulgarian defector Georgi Markov was fatally poisoned by a Bulgarian intelligence agent who approached him at a street corner in London and used an umbrella to inject a pellet into Markov's leg. Markov died four days later. An autopsy found a platinum pellet, smaller than the head of a pin and shown by a microscope to have small holes within it.

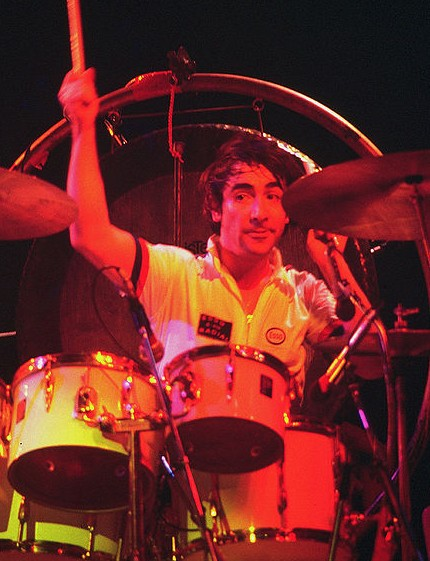
Keith Moon

- Keith Moon, 32, English musician and drummer for The Who, died of an overdose of the sedative clomethiazole, having ingested 32 pills. Moon's death took place inside apartment 12 of 9 Curzon Place in London, the same flat where Cass Elliot of the Mamas and the Papas had died in 1974 at the age of 32.

== September 8, 1978 (Friday) ==
- Iranian Army troops killed 122 rioters in Tehran and wounded 4,000 others after firing on the crowd.
- Died: Ricardo Zamora, 77, Spanish footballer and goalkeeper who managed the Spain national team from 1920 to 1936

== September 9, 1978 (Saturday) ==
- Simultaneous attacks were started across Nicaragua by the Sandinistas, a rebel organization attempting to end decades of rule of the Central American nation by the Somoza family, led by President Anastasio Somoza. The Sandinistas took control of the cities of Masaya and Esteli. By Wednesday, the group had control of northern Nicaragua and its three largest cities, Leon, Esteli and Chinandega. Nicaragua's National Guard suppressed the rebellion by September 20 at the cost of more than 1,000 lives.
- The Soviet space probe Venera 11 was launched from Baikonur at 8:25 in the morning local time (0329 UTC) to explore the planet Venus, and would land there on December 25, returning data for 95 minutes.
- Born: Gina Gogean, Romania artistic gymnast, world champion in the vault (1994, 1996); floor exercise (1995, 1996, 1997), and the balance beam (1997); in Câmpuri
- Died:
  - Jack L. Warner, 86, Canadian-born American film mogul who operated Warner Bros. from 1918 to 1973
  - Hugh MacDiarmid, 86, Scottish poet
  - Sylvia Ashby, 70, British-born Australian market researcher and pollster
  - James Alexander Cowan, 76, Canadian public relations consultant

== September 10, 1978 (Sunday) ==
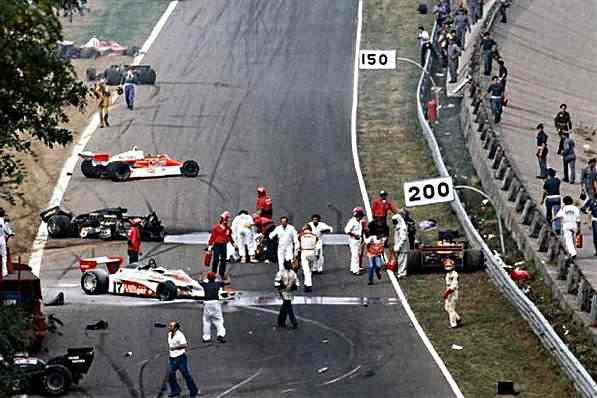
The fatal crash at the Italian Grand Prix

- An error at the start of the Italian Grand Prix caused an accident involving ten cars which killed driver Ronnie Peterson and injured Vittorio Brambilla.

== September 11, 1978 (Monday) ==
- New Jersey became the first of only 16 U.S. states to ratify the District of Columbia Voting Rights Amendment, a proposed 27th Amendment to the U.S. Constitution that would have given the District of Columbia two U.S. Senators and at least one U.S. Representative, without making D.C. the 51st state. Without 38 states having ratified by the deadline on August 22, 1985, the D.C. Voting Rights Amendment failed. The vote to ratify was 59 to 12 in the state assembly and 27 to 5 in the state senate.
- Born:
  - Ed Reed, American NFL player, 2004 NFL Defensive Player of the Year, holder of the NFL record for career interception yards (1,590), NFL interception leader 2004, 2008 and 2010), enshrined at the Pro Football Hall of Fame; in St. Rose, Louisiana
  - Else-Marthe Sørlie Lybekk, Norwegian team handball star with 215 caps for the Norway women's national handball team, 2008 gold medalist; in Gjøvik
  - Dejan Stanković, Serbian footballer with 103 caps for the Yugoslavian, and later the Serbian national team; in Belgrade, SR Serbia, Yugoslavia
  - Ben Lee, Australian actor and singer known for The Rage in Placid Lake; in Sydney
- Died:
  - Janet Parker, 40, British medical photographer at the University of Birmingham became the last human being to die from smallpox after having become ill from smallpox 25 days earlier.
  - Valerian Gracias, 77, Indian Roman Catholic Cardinal and Archbishop of Bombay since 1950
  - Georgi Markov, 49, Bulgarian novelist, journalist and dissident, died of blood poisoning after being assaulted on September 7.
  - Ronnie Peterson, 34, Swedish Formula One race car driver, died the day after being injured in a crash at the 1978 Italian Grand Prix.
  - Curtis Shake, 91, American jurist who served as the presiding judge in the IG Farben trial as part of the Nuremberg trials of 1947 and 1948.

== September 12, 1978 (Tuesday) ==
- For the first time since World War I, Greek warships were allowed by Turkey to pass through the Dardanelles and the Bosporus straits as two Greek Navy destroyers visited the Black Sea port of Odessa in the Soviet Union.
- The Declaration of Alma Ata was signed in the capital city of the Kazakh SSR in the Soviet Union, providing the core document on primary health care practices and paving the way for what is now the Kazakhstan healthcare system.
- The U.S. TV situation comedy Taxi, starring Judd Hirsch), Marilu Henner, Tony Danza, Christopher Lloyd, Danny DeVito and Andy Kaufman, premiered on the ABC network for the first of 114 episodes over five seasons. Created by James L. Brooks and David Davis, the show was inspired by an article in New York magazine, "Night-Shifting for the Hip Fleet", by Mark Jacobson, which appeared on September 22, 1975. The last original episode would be telecast on June 15, 1983. During its run, Taxi would win 18 Emmy Awards and 25 Golden Globes.
- Born:
  - Ruben Studdard, American gospel singer; in Frankfurt, West Germany
  - Ben McKenzie (stage name for Benjamin McKenzie Schenkkan), American TV and film actor; in Austin, Texas

== September 13, 1978 (Wednesday) ==
- Code-named "Diablo Hawk", the first test of Project Excalibur, a project by the U.S. Defense Nuclear Agency to develop an x-ray laser to disable ballistic missiles, was unsuccessful. The instrumentation on a device invented by George Chapline failed to measure any effects.
- The Ford Motor Company became the first U.S. corporation to be indicted on criminal charges, as a grand jury in Elkhart County, Indiana, returned a four count criminal indictment for reckless homicide and criminal negligence in the design and manufacture of a Ford Pinto automobile that had burst into flame in an accident on August 10 that killed three girls.
- Died: Annie Ina Laidlaw, 89, Australian nursing matron who led the Royal Australian Naval Nursing Service during the Second World War.

== September 14, 1978 (Thursday) ==
- The National Emergencies Act of 1976, passed on September 14, 1976, became effective, terminating four different states of emergency that had been declared in 1933 (to prevent bank failures), 1950 (during the Korean War), 1970 (during a postal strike) and 1971 (an economic policy declaration), ending the power of the U.S. President "to institute martial law, seize property and restrict travel" as well to "send armed forces into action abroad, take control of communications facilities and even set the stage for secret rules and regulations by closing the Federal Register.
- In the Philippines, 17 people near Manila were killed when a Philippine Air Force airplane crashed into the Barrio Santos neighborhood, along with 15 of the 24 people on the aircraft. The Fokker F-27 airplane was attempting to land at Nichols Air Base during a thunderstorm and was carrying members of the security staff of President Ferdinand Marcos, who had accompanied him to birthday celebrations.
- After only 17 days in office, the government of Portugal's Prime Minister Alfredo Nobre da Costa and his 14-member cabinet were forced to resign when a vote of no confidence passed, 140 to 123 in the Assembly of the Republic.
- The U.S. TV science fiction comedy Mork & Mindy, starring Robin Williams and Pam Dawber, premiered on the ABC network and would become the surprise hit of the 1978-79 U.S. prime time season as the third most popular program of the year. Despite the show's success, its producers decided to change the format the following season and ratings would decline dramatically, with cancellation in 1982 after four seasons and 91 episodes.
- Born:
  - Ben Cohen, English rugby union player, with 57 caps for the England national rugby union team and captain of the 2003 world champions; in Northampton, Northamptonshire
  - Ron DeSantis, U.S. politician, Republican Governor of Florida since 2019 and former U.S. Representative; in Jacksonville, Florida
  - Carmen Kass, Estonian supermodel; in Paide, Estonian SSR, Soviet Union

== September 15, 1978 (Friday) ==
- Muhammad Ali regained the world heavyweight boxing championship at the age of 36 in a unanimous decision in a 15-round bout with Leon Spinks, who had dethroned him from the heavyweight crown on February 15. The fight was telecast from the Superdome in New Orleans by the ABC network which had purchased the U.S. rights for $5.3 million.
- Born: Eiður Guðjohnsen, Icelandic footballer with 88 caps for the Iceland national team; in Reykjavík
- Died: Willy Messerschmitt, 80, German aircraft designer known for designing the Messerschmitt Bf 109 Luftwaffe fighter, the second most-produced warplane in history, and the Messerschmitt Me 209

== September 16, 1978 (Saturday) ==
- A 7.4 magnitude earthquake killed at least 15,000 people in the city of Tabas in Iran. The quake was measured with a maximum Mercalli intensity of IX (Violent).
- General Muhammad Zia-ul-Haq, who had overthrown the government a year earlier, formally assumed the post of President of Pakistan.
- For the first time in thoroughbred horse racing history, two U.S. Triple Crown winners competed against each other in the same race.Seattle Slew, who had won the Triple Crown (Kentucky Derby, Preakness Stakes and Belmont Stakes) in 1977 upset the 1978 Triple Crown winner, Affirmed in the Marlboro Cup Invitational Handicap at Belmont, New York, finishing in first place three lengths ahead of Affirmed.
- Born: Stephanie Murphy, American politician, U.S. Representative for Florida from 2017 to 2023 and the first Vietnamese-born woman to be member of the U.S. Congress; as Dang Thi Ngoc Dung in Ho Chi Minh City

== September 17, 1978 (Sunday) ==
- The Camp David Accords were signed at the U.S. presidential retreat of Camp David between Menahem Begin of Israel and Anwar Sadat of Egypt.
- The science fiction television show Battlestar Galactica, starring Lorne Greene, Richard Hatch, and Dirk Benedict, premiered on the ABC television network in the U.S., and would run for 24 episodes after poor ratings for the most expensive American TV program up to that time. The program was similar enough to the successful 1977 film Star Wars that 20th Century Fox sued Universal Studios for plagiarism, copyright infringement, unfair competition, and Lanham Act claims. The final original episode would be aired on April 29, 1979.
- Rolf Günther, a pastor in the town of Falkenstein in East Germany, committed self-immolation in front of his congregation during services at the Church of the Holy Cross. Günther had doused himself with a flammable liquid while in the vestry of the Church before walking to the front of the altar while the parishioners were singing a hymn, then stretched out his hands to the altar candles to ignite himself. Church officials denied that his action was politically motivated.

== September 18, 1978 (Monday) ==
- Pegasus 1, at 3,200 pounds (1,500 kg) one of the heaviest satellites ever launched into space, fell out of orbit after more than 13 years and burned up as it plummeted through Earth's atmosphere over northern Angola, with one large fragment plunging into the Atlantic Ocean off of the Angolan coast.
- The American TV situation comedy WKRP in Cincinnati, about a fictional radio station in Cincinnati, Ohio, premiered on the CBS network for the first of 90 episodes over four years. The last original episode would be telecast on April 21, 1982.
- Born: Billy Eichner, American TV actor, comedian and producer known for Difficult People; in Queens, New York City

== September 19, 1978 (Tuesday) ==
- Two days after the signing of the Camp David Accords, U.S. President Jimmy Carter made one of the most important decisions of his presidency and held a meeting at the White House with Chai Zemin, the Director of the Liaison Office of the People's Republic of China in Washington, to discuss relations between the two nations. After conferring with Chai, Carter ordered Leonard Woodcock, the U.S. liaison in Beijing, to inform the Chinese government of a change in U.S. foreign policy, and to establish full diplomatic relations by January 1, 1979. The conferences thereafter would be kept a secret for almost three months before a joint announcement from both Washington and Beijing that the U.S. and the PRC would exchange ambassadors and that the U.S. would sever diplomatic relations with the Republic of China at Taiwan.
- The Solomon Islands was admitted as the newest member of the United Nations.
- Born: Mariano Puerta, Argentine tennis player who reached the finals of the 2005 French Open but was banned from the sport for eight years because of doping; in San Francisco, Córdoba
- Died: Carl Bridgewater, 13, a newspaper carrier in England, was shot dead when he inadvertently disturbed a burglary.

== September 20, 1978 (Wednesday) ==
- The Rhodesian Air Force, Rhodesian Light Infantry and Special Air Service carried out Operation Snoopy, a massive retaliation against the Zimbabwe People's Revolutionary Army (ZIPRA) in neighboring Mozambique, near Chimoio, as well as against the armored division of the army of Mozambique. The operation was a punitive strike against the ZIPRA guerrillas for the September 3 shootdown Air Rhodesia Flight 825 and the massacre of its survivors.
- B. J. Vorster announced at a press conference that he was resigning as Prime Minister of South Africa after 12 years because he was unable to fulfill "the strenuous duties of office," but added that he would be available to fill the largely ceremonial office of State President. Vorster would be replaced on October 2 by his Minister of Defence, P. W. Botha.
- The Umm al-Tabul Mosque was completed in Baghdad, capital of Iraq, after 14 years of construction.
- Soviet cosmonauts Vladimir Kovalenok and Aleksandr Ivanchenkov, in orbit on the Salyut 6 space station, broke the record for longest time in outer space, surpassing the old record of 96 days and 10 hours. The two had been launched on Soyuz 29 on June 15.
- The musical revue Eubie!, featuring the jazz and ragtime music of composer Eubie Blake, opened on Broadway for the first of 439 performances.
- Born:
  - Jason Bay, Canadian baseball player, 2004 National League Rookie of the Year, inductee to the Canadian Baseball Hall of Fame; in Trail, British Columbia
  - Sarit Hadad (stage name for Sarah Hudadatov), Israeli pop music singer; in Afula
  - Inés Sainz, Mexican model and sports journalist; in Querétaro
- Died:
  - Elisa Ochoa, 80, the first woman elected to the Philippine Congress
  - Lilly Becher, 77, East German journalist and author

== September 21, 1978 (Thursday) ==
- Abdallah Mohamed Kamil was dismissed from his job as Prime Minister of Djibouti by President Hassan Gouled Aptidon, and was replaced by Barkat Gourad Hamadou on October 2.
- The Los Angeles Strings, led by Ilie Nastase and Chris Evert, defeated the Boston Lobsters, headed by Martina Navratilova, 28 to 25, to win the best 3-of-5 championship series of the original World Team Tennis (WTT).
- Born:
  - Doug Howlett, New Zealand rugby union player with 63 caps for the New Zealand national team; in Auckland
  - Josh Thomson, American mixed martial artist and lightweight world championship for Strikeforce mixed martial arts; in San Jose, California
  - Dinakar Thoogudeepa, Indian film director and actor; in Mysore, Karnataka state
- Died: Enrique Gomezjurado, 87, Ecuadorian artist

== September 22, 1978 (Friday) ==
- In the UK, 15,000 autoworkers went on strike against Ford of Britain, at the direction of the Transport and General Workers Union (TGWU).
- A U.S. Navy P-3 Orion fell apart while flying near the town of Poland, Maine, when an over-pressurized fuel tank caused one of its wings to separate from the craft, followed by part of the tail section, the other wing and the engines. All eight people aboard were killed.
- Born: Harry Kewell, Australian footballer with 58 caps for the Australia national team; in Sydney
- Died: A. J. Bakunas, 27, American stuntman, died one day after attempting to regain the world record for highest jump from a structure. Bakunas was in Lexington, Kentucky, where he had been part of the filming of the movie Steel, when he jumped from a height of 323 feet (98 m) from a tall building, with plans for his fall to be stopped by an inflated airbag. The bag split upon impact and he was fatally injured.

== September 23, 1978 (Saturday) ==
- Major League Baseball player Lyman Bostock, an outfielder for the California Angels, was fatally wounded when he was shot in the head while visiting friends in Gary, Indiana. Before driving to Gary, Bostock had scored the Angels' final run in a 5 to 4 loss to the Chicago White Sox at Chicago's Comiskey Park. He died the next day.
- Born: Anthony Mackie, American film actor and LGBT activist; in New Orleans

== September 24, 1978 (Sunday) ==
- Voters in Switzerland approved creation of the canton of Jura, the 26th canton of the European nation, with a capital at Delémont, which was carved out of the Canton of Bern.
- In the championship of Gaelic football, played at Croke Park in Dublin, County Kerry defeated County Dublin by a score of 5-11 to 0-9 (equivalent to 26 to 9.
- The Ayatollah Ruhollah Khomeini of Iran, who had lived at Najaf in Iraq for 13 years, was expelled from Iraq by President Saddam Hussein, pursuant to an agreement between Iran and Iraq, in order to prevent Khomeini from inciting a revolution. Khomeini was turned away from several Muslim nations before settling in France at Neauphle-le-Château. Three months later, Khomeini would return to Iran as its leader and the Shah of Iran would be forced to flee into exile.
- Died:
  - John Paisley, 55, U.S. intelligence agent and CIA officer, disappeared in Chesapeake Bay after being last seen on his sloop Brillig after departing from Solomons Island. The empty boat ran aground the next day at Point Lookout. A body, identified by Paisley's dental charts, was found floating in Chesapeake Bay one week later, at the mouth of the Potomac River. The decomposing corpse had been belted with 40 pounds (18 kg) of divers' weights, and a .38 caliber bullet was found behind Paisley's left ear.
  - Hasso von Manteuffel, 81, German General who directed tank warfare during the 1944 Battle of the Bulge

== September 25, 1978 (Monday) ==
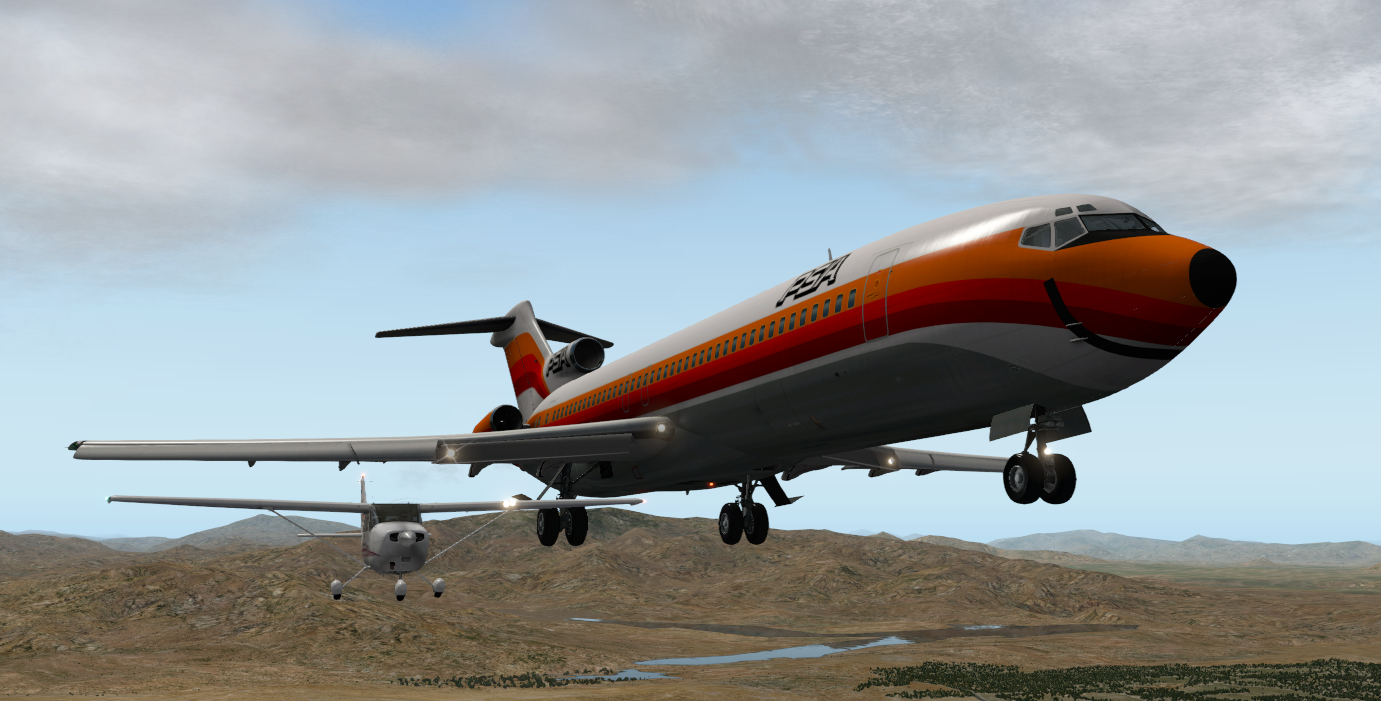
Artist's Rendition of the Initial collision (top) and GIF of the Radar tracking of PSA Flight 182 (bottom)
- In San Diego, California, 144 people were killed when Pacific Southwest Airlines Flight 182, a Boeing 727, collided with a small private airplane while attempting to land. At the time, the PSA 182 crash was listed as the worst air disaster in U.S. history, killing 128 passengers and seven crew on the airliner, both the flight instructor and the pilot on the Cessna 172, and 7 people near Balboa Park in San Diego's North Park neighborhood. The Boeing 727 crashed at the intersection of Nile Street and Dwight Street, and through houses as far as Boundary Street.
- Testimony before the United States House Select Committee on Assassinations resolved a mystery of almost 15 years about the "umbrella man" who could be seen on film footage opening an umbrella at the moment of the fatal shot during the 1963 assassination of John F. Kennedy. Ending speculation that he was sending a signal to shooters, Louie Steven Witt, an insurance salesman in Dallas, said that his purpose was to protest against Kennedy with a symbol of appeasement, said that "If the Guinness Book had records for people being in the wrong place at the wrong time and doing the wrong thing, I'd be number one in that category without even a runner-up."
- LIFE, a news and picture magazine, which had published as a popular weekly from 1936 to 1972, returned to regular publication as a monthly.
- Born: Irakli Kobakhidze, Prime Minister of Georgia since 2024; in Tbilisi, Georgian SSR, Soviet Union.
- Died: Bret Morrison, 66, American radio actor and cabaret singer, best known for portraying the title character on the show The Shadow.

== September 26, 1978 (Tuesday) ==
- Air Caribbean Flight 309 crashed on takeoff from San Juan, Puerto Rico, after narrowly missing a collision with Eastern Airlines Flight 75, which was landing at the same airport. The wake turbulence from the Eastern Airlines L-1011 Tri-Star jet was powerful enough that the pilot of the smaller Air Caribbean Beechcraft 18 lost control and the aircraft plummeted into a tavern in the San Juan barrio of Santurce. All six people on the Air Caribbean plane were killed, and several people in the tavern were injured, two of them fatally.
- South Korea launched its first ballistic missile, "Korea-1", a Nike Hercules surface-to-air rocket with a range of 90 miles (140 km), and capable of carrying a nuclear warhead. President Park Chung Hee had previously ordered the development of short-range missiles and a nuclear weapons program that he forecast to be operational by 1983. After Park's assassination in 1979, his successor, Chun Doo-hwan, discontinued further spending on the two programs.
- In a vote by parliamentary members of South Africa's ruling National Party, Defense Minister P. W. Botha was selected to be the new party chairman to succeed the outgoing John Vorster, and effectively became the designated successor to Vorster as Prime Minister of South Africa. On the first ballot, none of the three candidates received the 87 votes required for a majority, with P. W. Botha having 78, Black Affairs Minister Cornelius "Connie" Mulder 72 and Foreign Minister Pik Botha 22. Pik Botha withdrew and in the second vote P. W. Botha defeated Mulder, 98 to 74.
- Died: Manne Siegbahn, 91, Swedish physicist and 1924 Nobel Prize in Physics laureate for his discoveries and research in the field of X-ray spectroscopy

== September 27, 1978 (Wednesday) ==
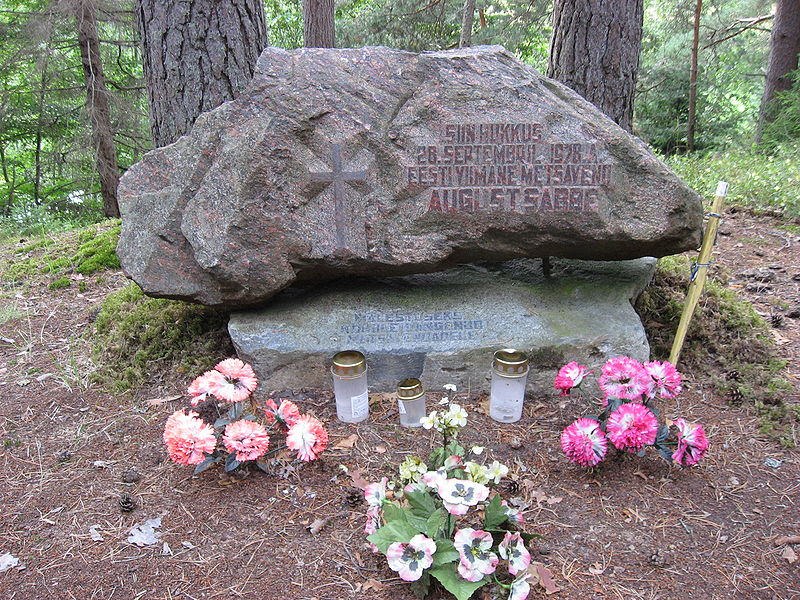
Graveside of August Sabbe, the last Estonian partisan

- August Sabbe, the last of the Estonian partisans who had resisted the Soviet Union's annexation of Estonia since 1940, was discovered, by two KGB agents who had been posing as fishermen. Sabbe, who had been the remaining member of the "Forest Brethren" ("Metsavennad") had hidden in the woods for more than 30 years before being tracked down by the Soviet intelligence service to his birthplace at the village of Paidra in the Estonian SSR and had jumped into the Vohandu River rather than to be arrested, and drowned at the age of 69.
- Pope John Paul I made his last public appearance, speaking to and entertaining a crowd at his fourth weekly papal audience.
- Born: Ani Lorak, popular Ukrainian singer; in Kitsman, Ukrainian SSR, Soviet Union

== September 28, 1978 (Thursday) ==
- Pope John Paul I died after only 35 days as the leader of the Roman Catholic Church. According to a spokesman for the Vatican, the Pope died at about 11 o'clock at night and his death was not discovered until 5:30 the next morning when his household staff arrived to wake him up. Almost 40 years later, an Italian journalist would publish findings that Pope John Paul had complained of chest pains the night before, and had severe pain in his chest at 7:00 in the evening while reciting the vespers along with his secretary, Bishop John Magee. Although the pain lasted for five minutes, the Pope directed that his physician, Dr. Renato Buzzonetti, not be called.
- Born: Dane Boedigheimer, American Internet personality, actor and musician, in Itasca County, Minnesota

== September 29, 1978 (Friday) ==
- United Nations Security Council Resolution 435, was passed, creating the United Nations Transition Assistance Group (UNTAG) for the eventual independence of the trusteeship territory of South-West Africa (now Namibia). The transition process would not begin until a ceasefire in 1988, with UNTAG providing security during the withdrawal of troops and supervision of elections in advance of Namibia's independence in 1990.
- Outgoing Prime Minister John Vorster was elected by a joint session of both houses of South Africa's parliament (the House of Assembly and the Senate) as the new State President of South Africa, a largely ceremonial post, with voting along party lines and 173 of the 204 votes coming from the National Party. Sir de Villiers Graaf of the New Republic Party was a distant second with 19, and Guerenino Bozzoli of the Progressive Party had 12.
- Born: Kurt Nilsen, Norwegian singer; in Bergen

== September 30, 1978 (Saturday) ==
- Finnair Flight 405 was hijacked by Aarno Lamminparras in Oulu in Finland. After collecting a $206,000 ransom, Lamminparras released 45 of his 48 hostages, taking with him the pilot, co-pilot and flight engineer on a flight to Amsterdam in the Netherlands.
- Born: Candice Michelle (ring name for Candice Michelle Beckman), American professional wrestler and model and 2007 WWE Women's Champion; in Milwaukee
- Died: Edgar Bergen, 75, American ventriloquist, comedian and radio star known for his program (with his dummy, Charlie McCarthy) on The Chase and Sanborn Hour on the NBC Radio Network, was found dead in his room at the Caesars Palace hotel in Las Vegas, where he had been booked for a two-week performance.; Bergen's death came only nine days after he had announced his retirement and his donation of the Charlie dummy to the Smithsonian Institution and the day after his third performance during the booking.
