= Jennifer Ramírez Rivero =

Venezuelan model (1978–2018)

- Born: 31 August 1978; San Cristóbal, Venezuela
- Died: 20 August 2018 (aged 39); Cúcuta, Colombia
- Occupations: Model, businesswoman

Jennifer Ramírez Rivero (31 August 1978 – 20 August 2018) was a Venezuelan model and owner of the clothing and accessories brands Mac River and Jen River. She was murdered in 2018 in Cúcuta, Colombia.

== Biography ==
Daughter of divorced Colombian parents, Ramirez owned the clothing and accessories brands Mac River and Jen River and had three stores in Santa Teresa, Barrio Obrero and Pueblo Nuevo in San Cristóbal, Venezuela. In 2000, she participated in the International Fair of San Sebastián, being a model of her own brand. Due to the crisis in Venezuela, her three stores closed and Ramírez sold her vehicle to look for better opportunities in Cúcuta, Colombia, where she moved with her two-year-old son.

In Cúcuta, she tried to start her business, but when it was not possible, she dedicated herself to selling clothes and selling cakes in front of the building where she lived. Around 20 August 2018, Ramirez was strangled in her apartment and found dead five days later along with her living son, who showed signs of malnutrition. The Cúcuta Metropolitan Police took the child into custody and transferred him to the Erasmo Meoz hospital for medical attention and food. The authorities initially considered the motive for the homicide to be a crime of passion, but subsequent inspections have coincided with a robbery as the motive for the murder.
