= 1978 JSL Cup final =

Football match in 1978

Mitsubishi Motors	Fujita Industries
2	1
- Date: August 27, 1978
- Venue: Okayama Athletic Stadium, Okayama

1978 JSL Cup final was the third final of the JSL Cup competition. The final was played at Okayama Athletic Stadium in Okayama on August 27, 1978. Mitsubishi Motors won the championship 2-1 over Fujita Industries.

== Overview ==
Mitsubishi Motors won their 1st title, by defeating Fujita Industries 2–1.

== Match details ==
August 27, 1978

Mitsubishi Motors	2-1	Fujita Industries
? ?' ? ?'		? ?'

Okayama Athletic Stadium

== See also ==
- 1978 JSL Cup
