= Charles H. Loeb =

American journalist

Charles Harold Loeb (April 2, 1905 – August 21, 1978) was an American journalist known for detailing radiation casualties from the Hiroshima bomb. Loeb's article reporting on World War II was published in multiple newspapers with support of the National Newspaper Publishers Association (known then as the National Negro Publishers Association, or NNPA). Loeb served multiple terms as chairman of the Editorial Society for the NNPA.

== Career ==
Loeb studied pre-med at Howard University in Washington, D.C. and then chose to pursue journalism instead. He later helped found The Louisiana Weekly and the Southern News Weekly. He joined the Cleveland Call and Post in 1933, eventually becoming a managing editor. Loeb had an unsuccessful bid in 1956 for U.S. Congress as a Republican.

=== World War II ===
One of Loeb's most significant works was an article originally published on October 5, 1945 in the Atlanta Daily World titled "Loeb Reflects On Atomic Bombed Area" in which he contradicted censored coverage of the bombing of Hiroshima at the end of the war. Loeb's description of the injury and suffering caused by radiation from the bombings went into greater detail than coverage in major outlets at the time, including The New York Times. The report was more descriptive of the structural damage of the bomb blast, but briefly detailed the effect of radiation poisoning, despite reports about human suffering being censored by the U.S. military. Loeb was later referred to by some journalists as the "dean of black newsmen".

== Personal life ==
Loeb was born in Baton Rouge, Louisiana to Leon and Lillian Loeb. He was married to Beulah Loeb. Their daughter, Stella Loeb-Munson stated that Charles Loeb had been "haunted" by memories of what he had seen in the aftermath of the bombings. Loeb died on August 21, 1978.
