= Telefon =

Telefon may refer to:

- Telefon (film), a 1977 film directed by Don Siegel, starring Charles Bronson
- "Telefon, Telefon", a song by Margot Hielscher
- Telefon Bay, in the South Shetland Islands
- Telefon Point, west of the entrance to Admiralty Bay, King George Island
- Telefon Ridge, in the South Shetland Islands
- Telefon Rocks, a group of rocks in King George Island, the South Shetland Islands
- The Norwegian steamship SS Telefon
- "Telefon", by Jesper Kyd from the 2018 Indian film Tumbbad
