= Telephone (disambiguation) =

A telephone is a telecommunication device which is used to transmit and receive sound simultaneously.

Telephone may also refer to:

== Telecommunications ==
- AT&T, sometimes called "Telephone" due to its U.S. ticker symbol "T" on the New York Stock Exchange
- Camera phone, a mobile phone that is also able to capture either still photographs or video
- Cordless telephone, a telephone with a wireless handset that communicates via radio waves to its base station
- Mobile phone, a wireless telecommunications device used for phone and data calls over a cellular network
- Smartphone, a mobile phone and a handheld personal computer.
- Radiotelephone or radiophone, a telephone that allows two or more people to talk via radio, often referring to an older radio telephone system that predated modern mobile (cellular) phones
- Softphone, a software program for making telephone calls over the Internet using computers
- Tin can telephone, a type of voice-transmitting device usually made from two tin cans and string or wire
- Videophone, telephones with video displays, which enable their users to see each other as well in real time

== Music ==
- Téléphone, a French rock band formed in 1976

=== Albums ===
- Telephone (album), a 1984 live album by Ron Carter and Jim Hall
- Téléphone (album), a 1977 album by Téléphone
- The Telephone Album, a 1998 album by Lotion

=== Songs ===
- "Telephone" (song), a 2010 song by Lady Gaga and Beyoncé
- "Telephone" (Exo-SC song), 2020
- "Telephone", by Chaka Khan on her album The Woman I Am, 1992
- "Telephone", by Diana Ross from the album Swept Away, 1984
- "Telephone", by Erykah Badu on her album New Amerykah Part One (4th World War), 2008
- "Telephone", by Waterparks on their album Fandom, 2019
- "Telephone (Won't You Ring)", a 1962 song by Shelley Fabares

== Other uses ==
- Telephone (game), also known as Chinese whispers
- Telephone game (game theory), a concept in game theory
- Telephone (sternwheeler), a steamboat in Oregon in the late 19th and early 20th centuries
- Telephone, Texas, an unincorporated community in Fannin County, Texas
- Telephone Road, a major street in Houston, Texas, USA
- Telephones, a 1995 short film by Christian Marclay
- Telephone (novel), a 2020 novel by Percival Everett

== See also ==
- Phone (disambiguation)
- The Telephone (disambiguation)
- Telefone (disambiguation)
- Telefon (disambiguation)
