= Stanisław Baranowski Spitsbergen Polar Station =

Research station in Svalbard, Norway

Coordinates: 77°04′20″N 15°11′30″E

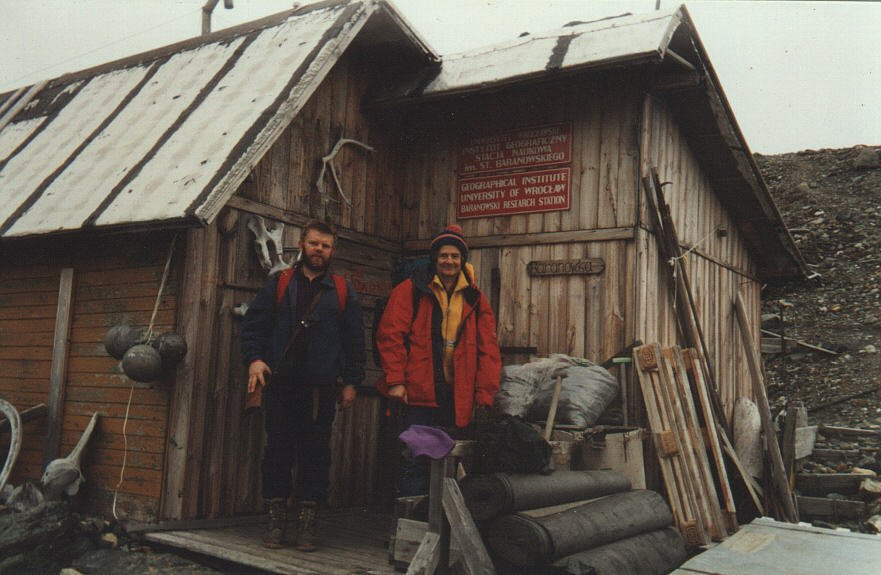
Polish polar explorers next to "Baranówka" - Baranowski Research Station of Geographical Institute of University of Wrocław

Stanisław Baranowski Spitsbergen Polar Station or Stanisław Baranowski Glaciological Station (Polish: Stacja Polarna im. Stanisława Baranowskiego na Spitsbergenie, nicknamed Baranówka or Werenhus) is a research station near the Werenskiold Glacier on Spitsbergen, the largest island of the Svalbard archipelago in Norway. It is operated by the Institute of Geography and Regional Development of the Polish University of Wrocław.

== History ==
The station was founded on Spitsbergen in 1971, when the first permanent structure was built. Polish scientists had a presence in that region since the 1950s, beginning with the initiative of the International Geophysical Year (1957-1958). It was named after Stanisław Baranowski (1935–78), a Polish glaciologist who died on King George Island as a result of an accident at the Henryk Arctowski Polish Antarctic Station while a member of the 1977–78 expedition. Baranowski was also involved in the creation of the station, and upon receiving the news of his death, the research team decided to name the station in honor of his work, a decision confirmed by the university. Over time, this led to the station being nicknamed Baranówka and in Norwegian, based on the nearby glacier's name, Werenhus.

As of 2005, the station is inhabited by a team of about six scientists. The station is usually staffed all year round, and has received numerous guests from Polish and foreign visiting researchers. As of 2010, the director of the station is Dr. Jerzy Pereyma.

== Research ==
Scientists at the station carry out climate, glacial, geomorphic and geological studies, primarily focusing on the Werenskiold Glacier.

== Location ==
The station is located about 1.5 km from the center of the Werenskiold Glacier, near the mid-run of the Brategg River.

== See also ==
- Baranowski Glacier
- List of research stations in the Arctic
- Nicolaus Copernicus University Polar Station
- Polish Polar Station, Hornsund
