= Wireless telephone =

Wireless telephone may refer to:

- Cordless telephone, a telephone in which the handset is portable and communicates with the body of the phone by radio, instead of being attached by a cord
- Mobile phone, a portable telephone that can make and receive calls over a radio frequency link while the user is moving within a telephone service area
- Photophone, a device invented jointly by Alexander Graham Bell and his assistant Charles Sumner Tainter in 1880

== See also ==
- Cordless
- Wireless communication
- Telephone (disambiguation)
- Phone (disambiguation)
