= Roberto Landell de Moura =

Brazilian Roman Catholic priest and inventor (1861–1928)

Father Roberto Landell de Moura
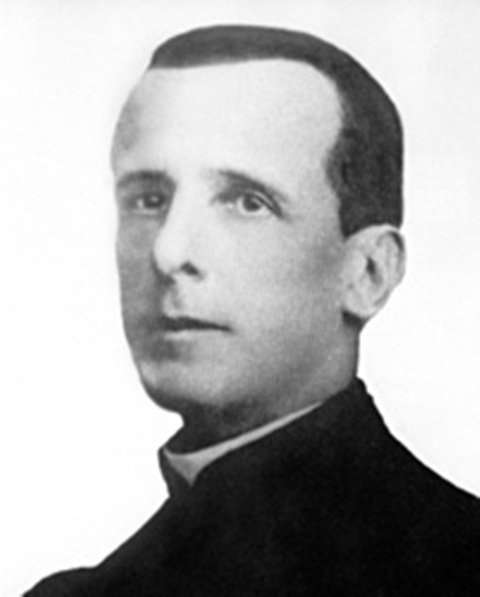
- Born: 22 January 1861; Porto Alegre, Rio Grande do Sul, Empire of Brazil
- Died: 30 June 1928 (aged 67); Porto Alegre, Rio Grande do sul, Brazil
- Known for: communications technologies

Father Roberto Landell de Moura (January 21, 1861 – June 30, 1928), commonly known as Roberto Landell, was a Brazilian Roman Catholic priest and inventor. He is best known for his attempts in the 1880s to develop long-distance audio transmissions device that combined an improved megaphone device and a photophone (using light beams). Landell received patents in Brazil and the United States during the first decade of the 1900s in which he also included designs that he claimed could transmit voice using radio waves.

== Early life ==
Roberto Landell de Moura was born in Porto Alegre, Brazil in 1861. His father was Ignacio de Moura, and he had five brothers: João, Edmundo and Ricardo (all apothecaries), Dr. Ignacio Landell, a physician, and Pedro Landell de Moura, a São Paulo merchant. He was ordained to the Catholic priesthood in 1886 in Rome, and also conducted studies in the physical sciences.

== Experimental work ==
Landell began experiments in wireless communication in Campinas and São Paulo in the period 1893–1894. A biographical review recounted that he "...invented his apparatus in Porto Alegre, and as soon as he arrived in São Paulo in 1896, he began with preliminary experiments, to achieve his object — to transmit human voice through the air.

=== Reported demonstrations ===
The June 10, 1900 issue of the Jornal do Commercio reported that on June 3 Landell made a public wireless telephony demonstration in the town of Alto de Sant Anna in the city of São Paulo, and the witnesses included P. C. P. Lupton, the British Consul, and his family. Shortly thereafter, the newspaper's June 16, 1900 issue printed the text of a letter Father Landell sent to Lupton prior to the demonstration, which noted that he would only be able to demonstrate five of his numerous inventions: the "Telauxiofono", "Caleofono", "Anematofono", "Teletiton" and "Edifono". In 1907 The Brazil of To-day provided English language descriptions of these devices:

- Telauxiofono (also spelled "telauxiophono" and "telauxiophone") "is the last word of the telephone, not only because of the force and intelligibility with which it transmits the words, but also because with it telephoning at great distances becomes a practical and economical reality."
- Caleofono (also spelled "caleophono", "kaleophono" and "kaleophone") "works also with wire, and presents the originality of not needing to ring the bell to call, to hear the articulated sounds, or that of the instrument."
- Anematofono (also spelled "anematophono" and anematophone") and teletiton "are wireless telephones. The perfect operation of these apparatus, according to what their inventor says, reveals laws entirely new and is altogether most curious."
- Edifono (also spelled "ediphono" and "ediphone") "is useful to purify and soften the phonographed voice of the parasitical vibrations, reproducing it just as the natural voice."

In his letter Landell also proposed that, with the support of British government, he could continue research to commercially develop his inventions, being compensated only for living expenses and the funds needed to continue his studies and scientific experiments. In addition, he offered to establish two facilities in England, dedicated to providing care for the sons and daughters of soldiers recently killed in the Second Boer War. However, the British government did not take him up on his offer.

In late 1900, a Rio de Janeiro newspaper carried an article about an American invention, Colonel George Edward Gouraud's "Gouraudphone" (rendered as Gouraudphono in Portuguese), which was a high-powered megaphone designed for long-distance communication. Contemporary accounts describe the Gouraudphone as a "talking foghorn": a sound amplifier that operated by "working a piston-valve in a cylinder and vibrating a current of air or gas, entering another cylinder and vibrating a large diaphragm which gives out an imitation of the original sounds. The intensity of the sound can be increased by having more than one piston and cylinder regulating air currents, so that the speech might be heard for several miles." Dr. José Rodrigues Botet took exception to this report, and the December 16, 1900 issue of the La Voz de España carried a letter from him insisting that it was actually Landell who deserved credit for developing the underlying technology used by the Gouraudphone. Botet's letter stated that over the years he had personally witnessed Landell, working alone, develop advanced wire and wireless telegraphy and telephony equipment, while never receiving the recognition he deserved as "Brazil's eminent son".

== Patents ==
=== 1901 Brazilian patent ===
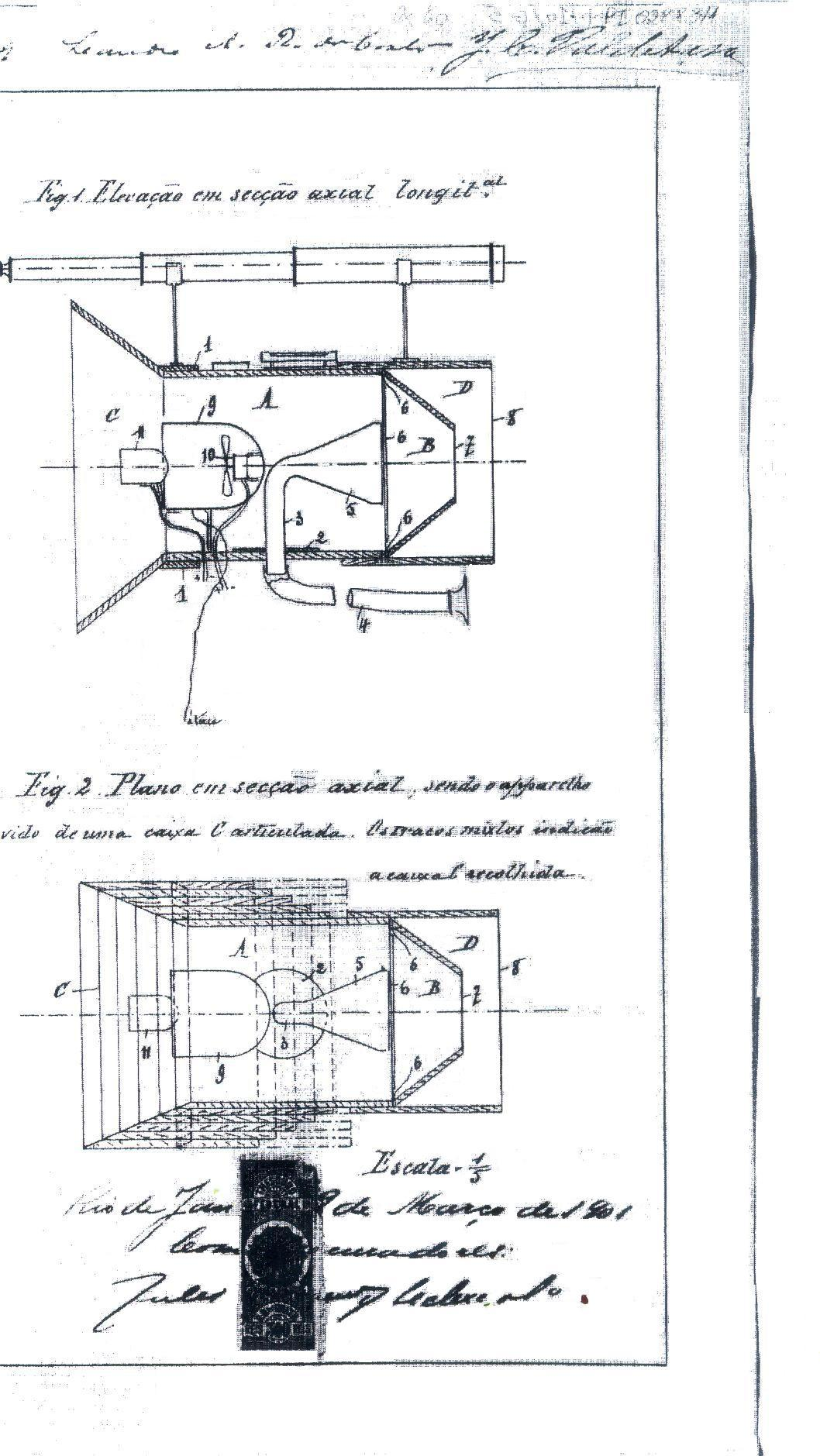
First two figures in Landell's 1901 Brazilian patent no. 3,279

Landell received his first patent, no. 3,279, from the Brazilian government on March 9, 1901. It covered a device for providing two-way "Phonetic transmission at a distance, with or without wire, through space, Earth and water". Two configurations were described: a full design, known as the "Tellogostomo", and a simpler version, called the "Telauxiophone":

- Tellogostomo: The construction information stated that the full assembly was divided into four boxes. A telescope, compass, and level were attached to aid correct orientation of the communicating units. Also specified was a "compulsor", described as "an electric fan of great speed of rotation", which, because of the noise it made, had to be turned off when receiving. The design included a "photophore", or light source "of great intensity", and headphones were specified for use when receiving signals.

The patent specifications provide only limited information on how the device operated. It appears that the transmitting process employed a speaking tube that directed sounds into the device, causing vibrations which were strengthened by the airflow from the compulsor fan. The device would then act as a megaphone, amplifying the sound. The unit could also be used to operate a standard photophone, with the photophore's bright light modulated by the sonic vibrations, so that at the receiving site this flickering light beam could be converted back into sound.
The patent diagrams do not include any radio equipment, although the accompanying description mentions the potential of adding a "Branly tube" for receiving radio signals. (A Branly tube, more commonly known as a "coherer", was a simple form of radio signal detector, which was limited to on-off operations, so it could only be used to receive the dots-and-dashes of Morse code, and could not be used to receive audio radio transmissions).

- Telauxiophone: The patent specified that many of the components used for transmissions through the air — including the telescope, compass, level, compulsor fan, photophore light source and acoustic tube — could be eliminated in a simpler version of the device

The names specified for transmissions made through water were Telhydrauliograph for telegraphic signalling, and Telhydrauliophone for telephonic usage.

=== 1904 United States patents ===
In June 1901 Landell left Brazil and traveled to Italy, then to France, and arrived in the United States in August, even though he did not speak English. While there he applied for a U.S. patent for his wireless telephony work, a process that would take three years.

Landell apparently did not make any demonstrations while in the United States. However, he was interviewed for an article reviewing photophone technology, which was published in the October 12, 1902 New York Herald. This article quoted him as saying:

"I wish to show to the world," he told me, "that the Catholic Church is not the enemy of science or of human progress. Individuals in the Church may in this or that case have opposed the light, but they did it in blindness to Catholic truth. I have myself met with opposition from my fellow believers. In Brazil a superstitious mob, holding that I was in partnership with the devil, broke into my study and destroyed my apparatus. Nearly all my friends of education and intelligence, whether in or out of holy orders, looked upon my theories as contrary to science. I know what it is to feel like Galileo, and to cry, 'E pur si muove.' When everybody was against me I simply stood my ground and said, 'It is so, it can be no otherwise.' "
Father Landell explained that it was impossible for him to go into details concerning his theories and inventions so long as the patents were pending. But in a general way he was willing to explain that his system of wireless telephony depended upon a new principle of light which he had discovered.
"By virtue of this principle," he went on, "it is possible to transmit speech through a luminous axis without the intervention of silenium or of a microphone. Nay, even a receiver will not be necessary. All persons within the radius of reception will be able to hear the message with the aid merely of their natural organs."
"And what is the distance to which you can reach?"
"Practically infinite."

On October 4, 1901, Landell submitted an application to the U.S. patent office for a comprehensive patent, which included a number of additions and modifications to his Brazilian grant. A major addition was the inclusion of information about making audio transmissions using radio signals. Landell also was now asserting that "actinic rays" (ultraviolet and near-ultraviolet light) would increase transmission efficiencies.

A month later an examiner replied with review notes. In particular, the examiner was dubious whether actinic rays would actually enhance transmissions. The notes also included the statement: "Attention is called to the fact that the claims cover at least two separate and independent inventions, one in wireless telephony and the other the wireless telegraph system." Responding to this, Landell then divided his application into multiple requests.

Landell's response to the patent office included a summary of what he intended to patent:

"My invention consists of an apparatus that works without wires as conductors and has the property of concentrating, reinforcing electric and luminous sound waves, for the principal purposes of 1st) sending and receiving the natural voice through space by means of sound waves. 2nd) telephoning also through space by means of the principle of photophone, and 3rd) sending and receiving phonetic, graphic and harmonic signs, through space, water and the earth by means of electric waves. The apparatus takes different names according to the effect produced. In the first instance it is called 'The Esophone', in the second 'The Photophone', and in the third 'The Radiographone'. The working distance of the first is at least 4 or 5 miles; of the second from 5 to 7 miles and of the third from 10 to 15 miles. These potentialities of sending and receiving can be increased in the first case by augmenting the proportions of certain parts; in the second case by communicating greater intensity to the luminous focuses, and in the third case by using a more powerful Ruhmkorff coil... When the wind is contrary or the distances impede the effects of the Esophone, we can use the Photophone, and when tempests or distances do not favor the working of the Photophone, we can use the Radiographone."

Ultimately, Landell was issued three U.S. patents covering his work:

- Patent no. 771,917, "Wave-Transmitter", issued October 11, 1904 for an application filed February 9, 1903 (serial no. 142,440). This was for a dual-use transmitter, capable of making audio transmissions by both the photophone method and via electro-magnetic radiation (radio waves). In the patent, Landell noted that: "It will be observed that the most important feature of my invention consists of the employment of a make-and-break transmitter worked by sonorous vibrations, causing transmitted electro-magnetic or light waves to correspond closely to the sound-waves by which they are produced."
- Patent no. 775,337, "Wireless Telephone", issued November 22, 1904 for an application filed October 4, 1901 (serial no. 77,576). This primarily describes a photophone configuration, for which "clear actinic light is absolutely necessary". It also included the "compulsor" fan described in the Brazilian patent.
- Patent no. 775,846, "Wireless Telegraph", issued November 22, 1904 for an application filed January 16, 1902 (serial no. 89,976). This patent also primarily covered transmissions. It included a Crookes tube, whose "cathode-rays, like the actinic and the etheric waves, above described, apparently reinforce each other in their effects, and the result is that the telegraph is more effective when both are employed".

== Reconstructions ==
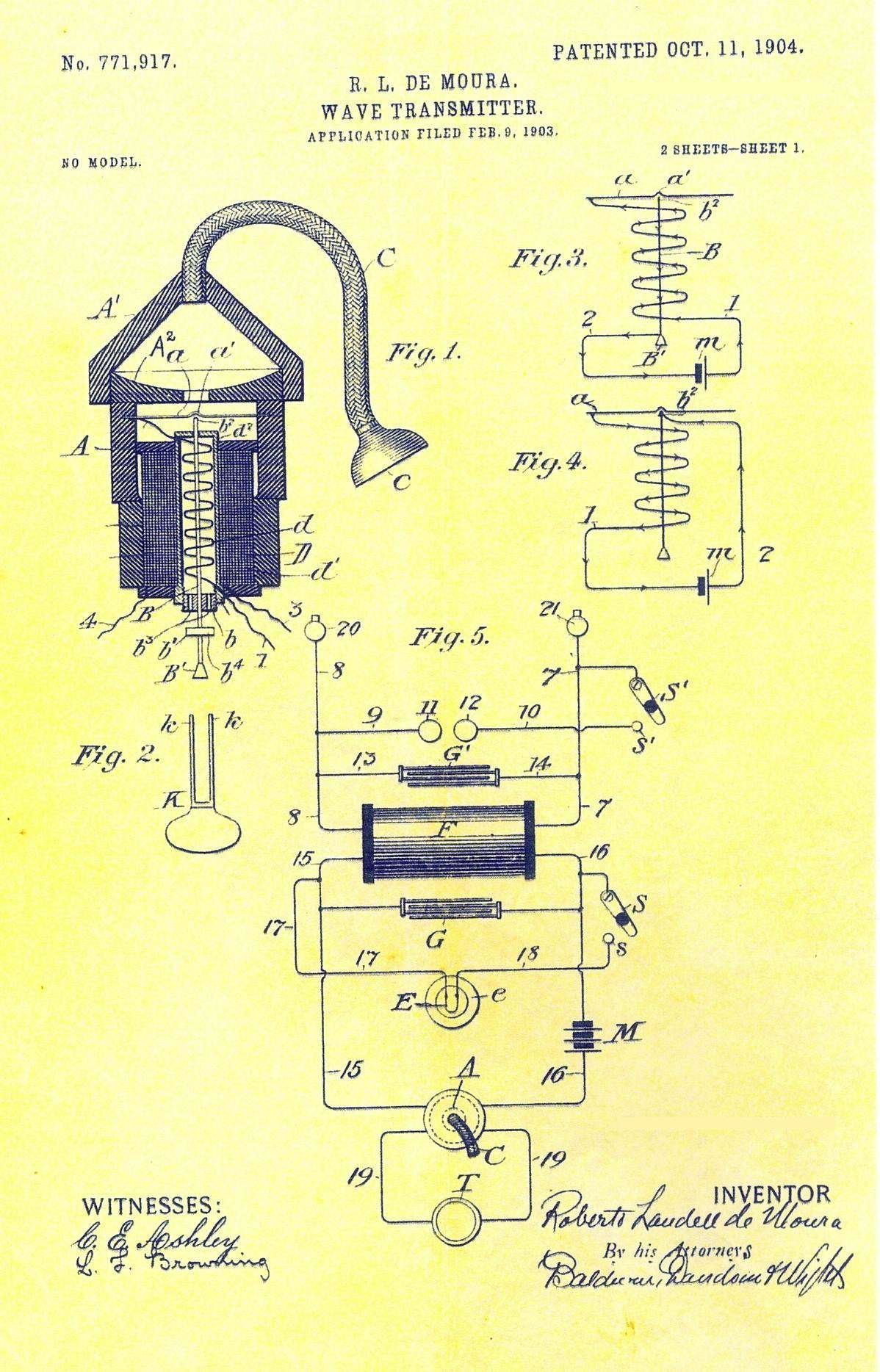
Schematic of the wave transmitter patented in 1904.

In 1984, Porto Alegre's Fundação de Ciência e Tecnologia rebuilt the Wave Transmitter patented in 1904 in the United States. The tests were successful in transmitting over a wide frequency range and over distances of up to 50 meters. The technicians assume that at the time of the priest the distance could have been much greater, due to the absence of the electromagnetic interference that exists today. The device severely distorted the voice, making it often incomprehensible, but its effectiveness in transmitting sound was proven. The device was publicly demonstrated in 1984, and Almeida describes the event:

The device was presented in public, for the first time, at the closing ceremonies of Semana da Pátria. On September 7, 1984, in front of the Monument to the Expeditionary, in the capital of Rio Grande do Sul, the governor of Rio Grande do Sul, Jair Soares, uttered, through the handset, two words that were clearly heard by hundreds of people: 'Porto Alegre'. unquestionably the functionality of Father Landell's invention.

In 2004 Marco Aurélio Cardoso Moura, with technical support from Rolf Stephan and Alexandre Stephan, from Industrial Eletro Mecânica Apex Ltda., Made another reconstruction, also functional and also with a very distorted sound, receiving better in the range of medium waves and in FM. Ferrareto stated:

the existing evidence points, therefore, to the success of Landell de Moura in the transmission and reception of voice even though the quality did not allow the immediate practical application of the devices created by the Brazilian. The improvement of these in the national territory would depend on a significant contribution of resources based on an awareness of the strategic importance of such technology. Consciousness that did not exist in Brazil then.

The qualification and stabilization of the signal would depend on technological advances that would be made a little later, mainly through John Ambrose Fleming, Reginald Fessenden, Edwin Howard Armstrong and Lee De Forest.

== Later life ==
Landell returned to Brazil after receiving the U.S. patents. An article in the March 11, 1905 Jornal do Commercio stated that his inventions "can reach easily from 30 to 50 kilometers and even at greater distances". In December 1905 he submitted a request to the São Paulo state legislature for funding to support experimentation, however, this was not approved. After this he apparently ended research into long-distance communication.

Later reports stated that he was working on ideas for a "Telephotorama", or "The Distance Vision". He also did photography research and reported effects similar to Kirlian photography. On January 21, 2011, Brazil issued a stamp commemorating the 150th anniversary of Landell's birth, which shows him using a device described in one of his 1904 United States patents.

== Honors ==
- Honorary citizen of city of São Paulo
- Patron of Science, Technology and Innovation in the municipality of Porto Alegre
- Patron of Brazilian radio amateurs
- Name was inscribed in the Tancredo Neves Pantheon of the Fatherland and Freedom by presidential decree in 2012, a cenotaph in the Brazilian capital Brasília dedicated to the honour of national heroes.

== See also ==
- Edgar Roquette-Pinto
- List of Roman Catholic scientist-clerics
