= Polish Polar Station, Hornsund =

Hornsund Isbjørnhamna
- Polish Arctic research station
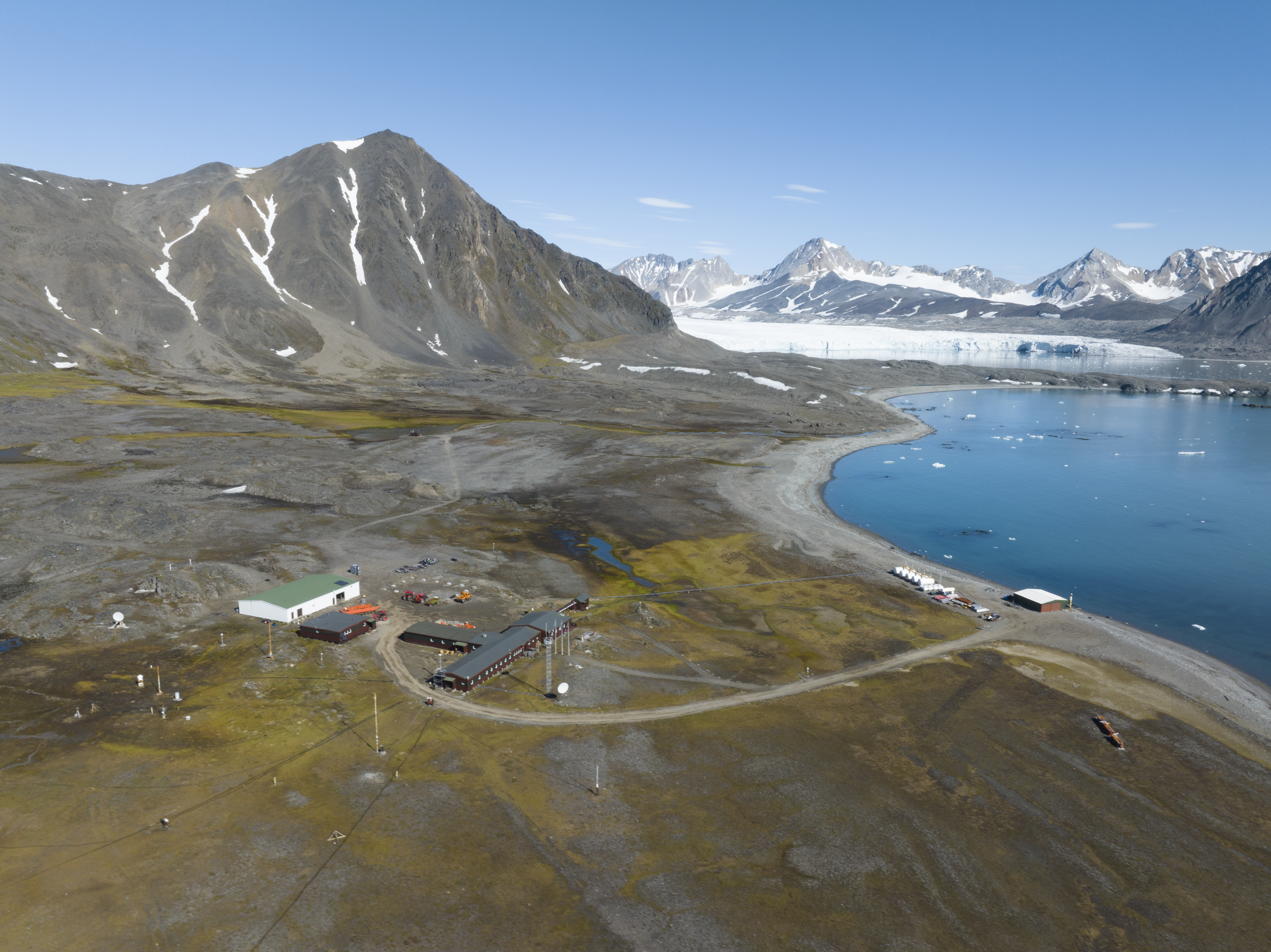
- The station from above

- Coat of arms

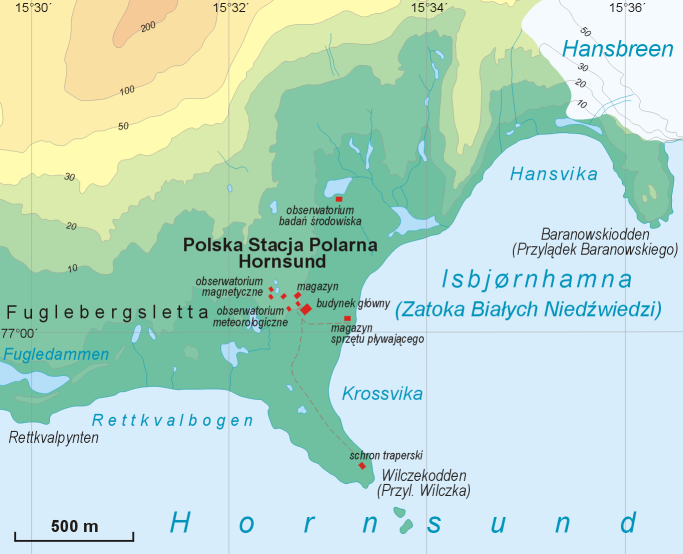

- Location in Svalbard
- Coordinates: 77°0′0″N 15°33′0″E
- Country: Norway
- Syssel: Svalbard
- Island: Spitsbergen

Population
  - Total: 12
- Time zone: UTC+2 (CET)
  - Summer (DST): +3
- Postal code: 9177

Hornsund (Polish: Polska Stacja Polarna, Hornsund) is a settlement and a Polish research station located at Isbjørnhamna in the fjord with the same name, on Spitsbergen in southern Svalbard, operated since 1957.

== Station ==
The station was erected in July 1957 by the Polish Academy of Sciences Expedition within the framework of the International Geophysical Year. The expedition was led by Stanislaw Siedlecki, geologist, explorer and climber, a veteran of Polish Arctic expeditions in the 1930s (including the first traverse of West Spitsbergen island). A reconnaissance group searching the area for the future station site had been working in Hornsund in the previous summer, and selected the flat marine terrace in Isbjørnhamna. The research station was constructed during three summer months in 1957.

After several years of limited use and deterioration, the station underwent a major reconstruction in 1978 as part of a Polish government program to resume continuous polar research. The expedition was organized by the Institute of Geophysics, Polish Academy of Sciences and led by Jan Szupryczyński, a geomorphologist and professor of the Polish Academy of Sciences. Its principal objectives were to reconstruct and expand the station, prepare it for year-round operation, and establish systematic meteorological, seismic, geomagnetic and periglacial observations. Polish Polar Station Hornsund. The 1978 expedition was a major construction and scientific operation. It departed Gdynia on 23 June 1978 aboard m/s Kapitan Ledóchowski, carrying 788 tonnes of construction materials, fuel, scientific equipment, provisions and other supplies. The expedition reached Hornsund on 28 June, and construction and expansion work was carried out from July through September. The main station building was reconstructed, a new power-station and workshop building was erected, fuel tanks were installed, and new electrical and water-supply systems were provided. Meteorological, magnetic and seismic facilities were also established. The reconstructed station was formally opened on 20 September 1978. Jan Szupryczyński subsequently led the 1978/1979 wintering expedition, which constituted the first post-1957 continuous wintering operation at Hornsund. The wintering team consisted of ten members and conducted scientific observations and research throughout the polar year. Szupryczyński published an account of the expedition, Expedition to Spitsbergen (June 1978–July 1979), in Polish Polar Research in 1980. The expedition included research in geomorphology, geology, hydrology, meteorology, seismology and geomagnetism. PAS Journals. The reconstruction and the 1978/1979 wintering expedition marked the beginning of continuous, year-round Polish scientific activity at Hornsund, which has continued since 1978. In 1979, a summer base was added to the original station building, providing additional accommodation and sanitary facilities for seasonal research groups. Polish Polar Station Hornsund. • I PAN Polar Expedition, 1978/1979 — Jan Szupryczyński, manager • II PAN Polar Expedition, 1979/1980 — Marian Pulina, manager • III PAN Polar Expedition, 1980/1981 — Janusz Niewiadomski, manager.

== Location ==
South Spitsbergen, near the entrance to Hornsund fjord, on its northern shore, at Isbjørnhamna on a flat marine terrace, 10 m above sea level.

== Research ==
Current full-year research:

- Meteorology - gathering data for synoptic purposes and to detect climatic changes;
- Seismology - monitoring of world earthquakes, measuring the seismicity of the Spitsbergen Archipelago region, and registering tremors linked to the dynamics of the Hans Glacier;
- Geomagnetism - registering changes in the XYZ components of the Earth's magnetic field;
- Ionospheric sounding to determine the structure of the ionosphere; using riometer measurements to determine the structure and absorption coefficient of the ionosphere;
- Glaciology - measurements of glacier dynamics (Hansbreen, Werenskioldbreen), documentation of glacier recession;
- Atmospheric electricity - determining the magnitude of the Earth's electric field and recording its vertical component;
- Environmental monitoring - recording of selected climatic features and conducting analyses of chemical buildup of air and water pollution and the isotopic content of the snow cover.

In summers and winters, the station functions as a base for research on geology, geodesics, geomorphology, glaciology, oceanology and biology.

== Time capsule ==
On September 17, 2017, near the station, scientific researchers buried a 60-centimeter stainless steel tube containing samples designed to tell finders as long as half a million years into the future, about the current state of knowledge in such areas as geology, biology, and technology.

== Photos ==
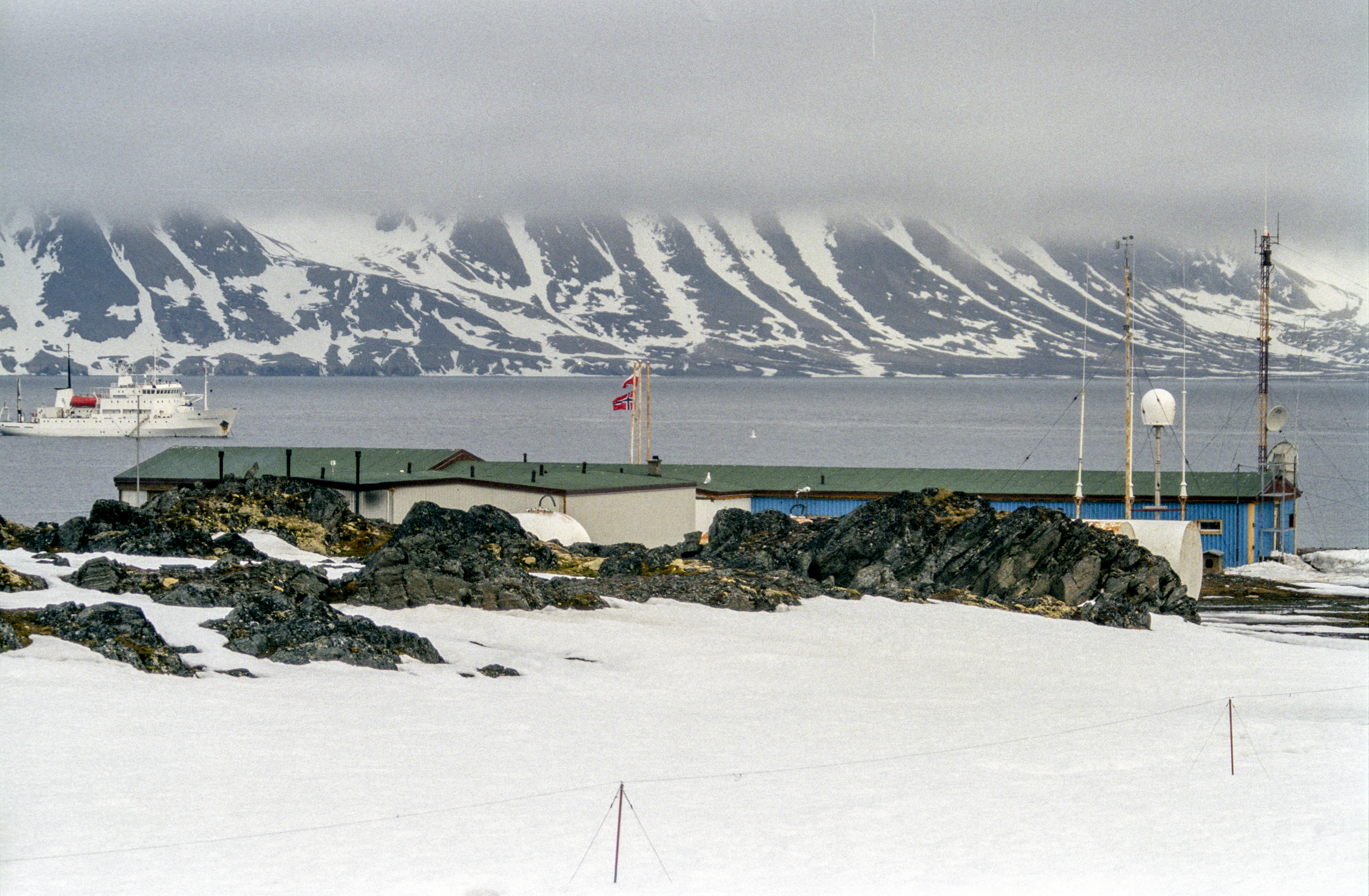
View of the station across Hornsund (2003)

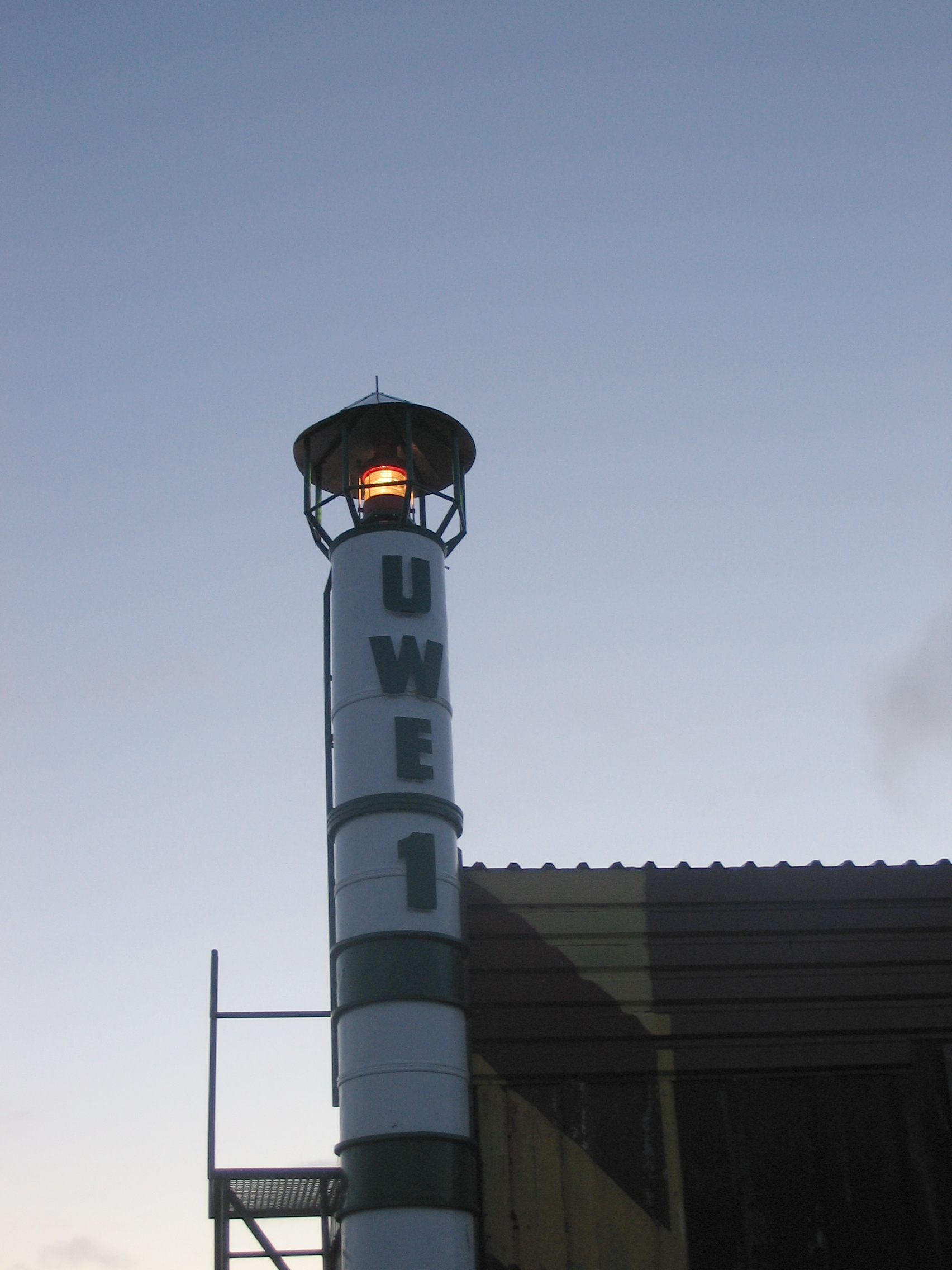
Lighthouse of the station

== See also ==
- List of research stations in the Arctic
