= Sentry Cove =

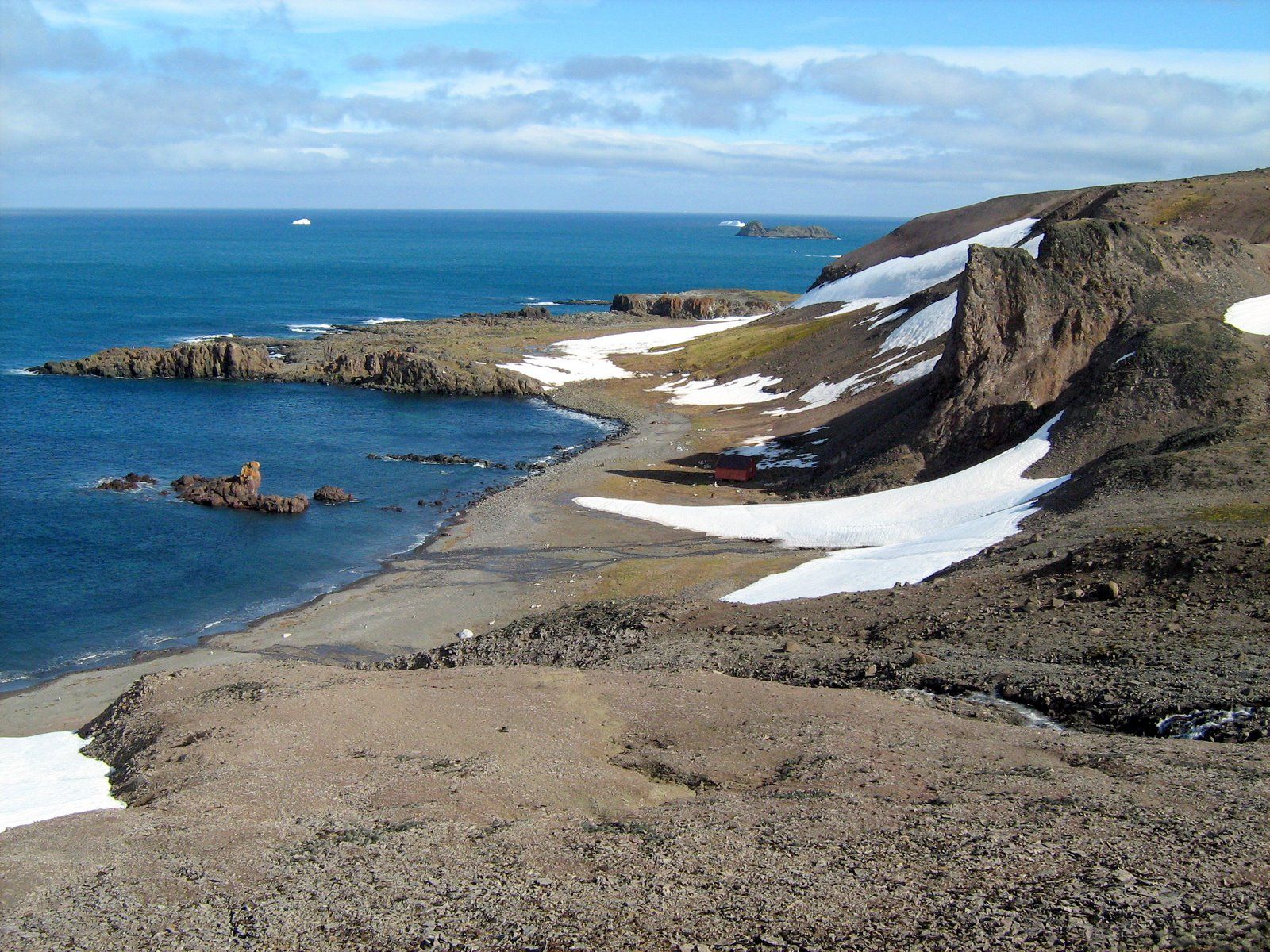
Sentry Cove (Paradise Cove)

Sentry Cove (62°13′S 58°26′W) is a cove on the southwest side of Demay Point, Admiralty Bay, King George Island. So named following geological work by British Antarctic Survey (BAS), 1975–76. The name derives from the serried row of upended whale skulls along the beach at the head of the cove. After 1979, a Polish Antarctic Expedition referred to this feature as "Rajska Zatoka" (paradise cove).
