= Selnes =

Selnes may refer to

- Selnes, Iceland, a place in Austurland, Iceland and a lighthouse in Iceland
- Selnes, Trøndelag, a village in Heim Municipality in Trøndelag, Norway
- SS Selnes, a Norwegian cargo ship in service 1946-50
