= Wave Transmitter =

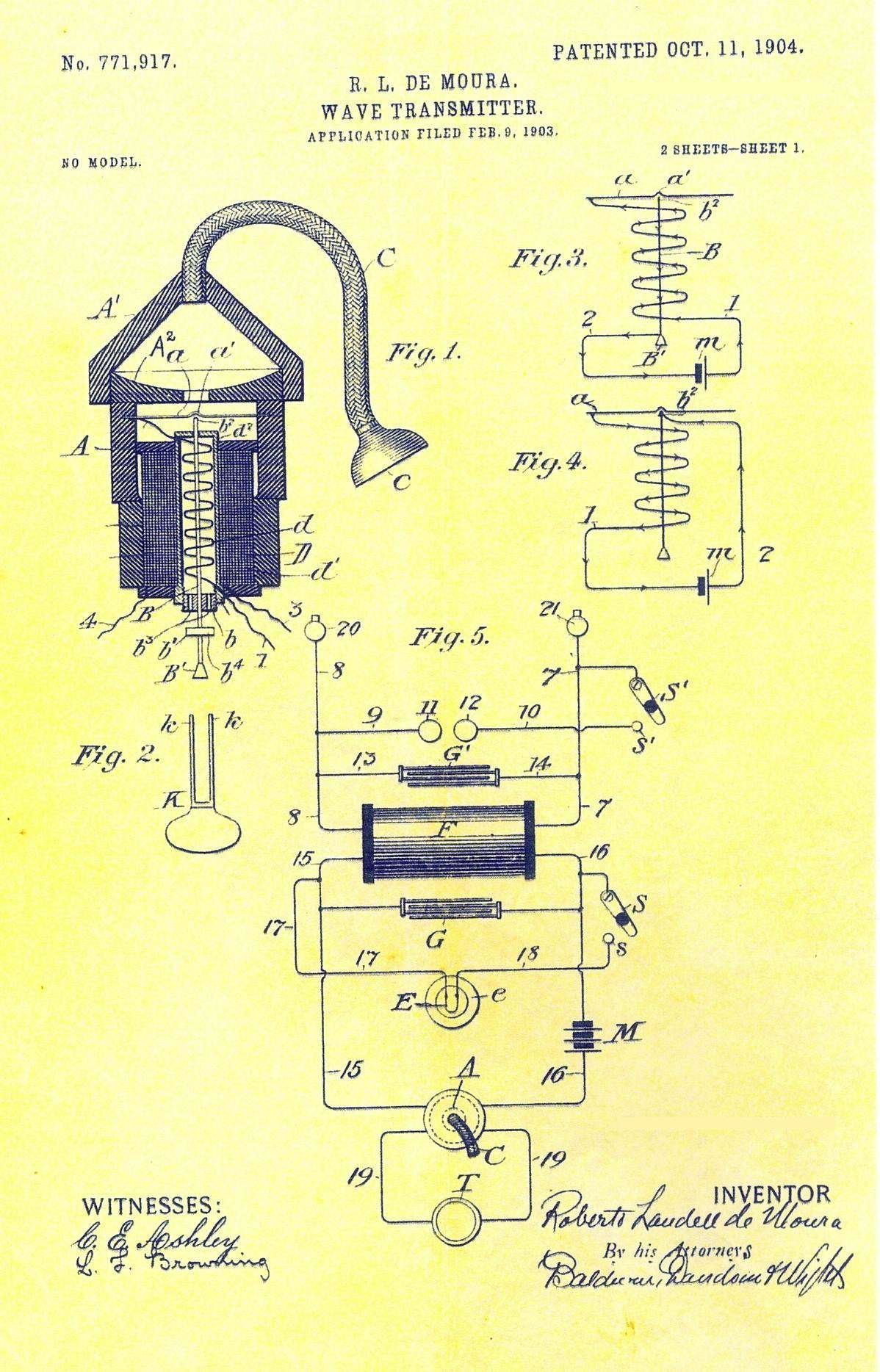
- Schematics of the Wave Transmitter, 1904
- Type: Radio transmitter/receiver
- Inventor: Roberto Landell de Moura
- Inception: 1904
- Notes

The Wave Transmitter was a radio transmitter/receiver, described in a patent by Roberto Landell de Moura in 1904, capable of transmitting audio via radio waves as well as light (similar to a photophone). It was developed after many years of Landell de Moura experimenting with multi-function devices that were combinations of megaphones, photophones, and radio telegraphs.

== History ==
=== Background ===
Landell de Moura began experiments in wireless communication in the mid 1890s. He worked with electrically powered megaphones, photophones, and when radio technology came along, incorporated radio telegraphy. By 1900 Landell de Moura was giving public demonstration of a device that seemed to use light (a photophone), a device he received a Brazilian patent for in 1901.

On 14 June 1901, he boarded the steamship Piemonte for Europe, from where he then went to the United States, where he sought to patent his inventions, and set up a workshop in New York. During his stay in the U.S., he received patents for a Photophone with radio wave bell or buzzer to alert the user at the other end and a stand-alone wireless telegraph using light or radio waves. He had to change his patent descriptions several times due to the requirements of the Patent Office.

In 1904, he received a patent for his wave transmitter, patent no. 771917. According to the American technicians who analyzed his research during the patent issuance process, his wireless transmission system was superior to what had already been developed, and regarding radiotelephony itself, he was "the discoverer and creator of the principles on which it is based." With the public announcement about his patents, several entrepreneurs offered to buy the rights, but Landell de Moura refused them, declaring: "'The inventions no longer belong to me. By the grace of God, I am merely their custodian. I will take them to my homeland, Brazil, which will be responsible for delivering them to humanity.'"

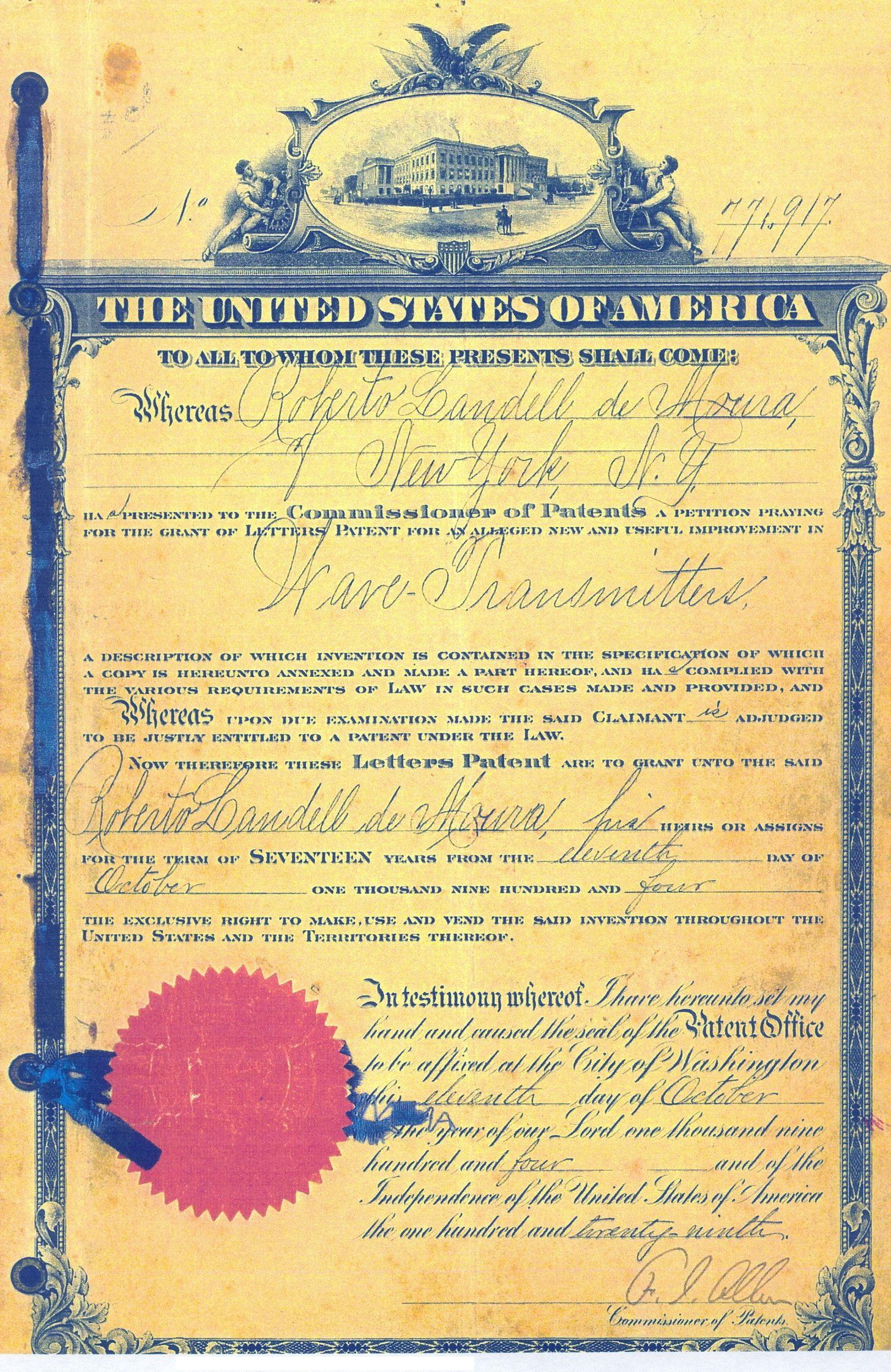
U.S. patent certificate

At the end of 1904, he had to return to Brazil with a debt of US$4,000 ($143,333 in 2025), hoping to return to New York in a short time, and, according to Ernani Fornari, patent other six inventions, but he had to abandon his plans. He sought to gain support from the Brazilian government to demonstrate his equipment offshore. However, when meeting with a government representative, he stated that the ships could be at any distance from each other, even suggesting the possibility of interplanetary communication, which was not well received by the government official. He also sought support from the Legislative Assembly of São Paulo to finance the commercialization of his invention, without success. According to Alencar, after the Brazilian government's refusal, Landell de Moura would have destroyed his experiments and given up scientific research. After these events, the federal government began to invest in radio telegraphy for the Armed Forces.

=== Operation ===
The Wave Transmitter, originally called the Gouradphone, (Note: J. Rodrigo Botet indicates that the device was also called Telephono.) built in an artisanal way, used an electromechanical microphone, invented by Landell, capable of collecting, according to Claudia Zaltrão, "sound waves through a resonance chamber," whose metallic diaphragm "opened and closed the primary of a Ruhmkorff coil, and induced a high voltage in the secondary of that coil which was radiated either through an antenna or two sparking spheres." The two spheres are called "phonetic interrupter," which, when exposed to the vibrations of the human voice or other sounds, create a series of electric sparks or flashes of light that, when they reach the receiver, are made understandable through a telephone, a lamp, or a Morse code device. However, the radiated voice did not contain the characteristics of the speaker's timbre, requiring training to understand the content of the messages. However, the signal contained many harmonics, allowing it to be detected over a wide range of frequencies.

According to the Cientec team, who replicated the invention, the "phonetic interrupter" was Landell's true innovation, as the other parts of the equipment were already known. According to a report from A Federação, 1905, the transmission of light waves would reach 30 to 50 kilometers and would not have climatic interference, as the beam of light would be modified both by mechanical vibration and by the electrical vibrations produced by the voice.

The device also used both radio waves and light beams, in addition to using continuous waves, with Landell advocating the use of short waves for long-distance communication, something that Marconi only recognized as useful in 1916. D'Arisbo notes that the device for transmitting light waves would be different from that for transmitting electromagnetic waves, while the patent issued in the US explains that the vibrations of the phonetic interrupter are transformed into both electrical and light waves, (Note: James P. Rybak explains that the focus of this invention, although it also considers light transmission, would be the transmission of radio waves, which, in the researcher's view, would be superior.) with Bruscato explaining that the "telephone" and the "wireless telegraph" are those that used light beams. The biographer Hamilton Almeida reports that Landell took more than 10 years to develop his equipment, having started to develop his ideas around 1886, after returning from his studies in Rome. Essentially, Landell sought to establish a point-to-point connection with electromagnetic waves, with the Wave Transmitter radiating information in all directions. Drawing a comparison between the experiments of Landell and Marconi, researchers César Augusto dos Santos and Otto Albuquerque explain as follows:

Landell's patent, in 1901, according to Albuquerque, had priority of speech transmission in a photonic-electronic system, while Marconi's patent focused only on the transmission of signals in Morse code. Both researchers agree that Marconi and Landell conducted similar experiments, but with different aims, with Santos explaining that "the priest-scientist was the first radio amateur in voice telegraphy and the first broadcaster with continued contacts in the country and abroad."

==== Legacy ====
In the 1980s, a working group from Telebrás, when analyzing the patents issued by the United States, considered that Landell was the first to carry out continuous wave transmissions, using a valve equivalent to the three-electrode valve patented by Lee De Forest in 1907. At the same time, Edson Benedicto Ramos Féris, then an engineer at the Telebrás Research and Development Center and a professor at USP, explained, after analyzing the patents, that the luminous system used by Landell was a predecessor of fiber optics, as, despite the differences, they are based on the same principle. When discussing the importance of these patents, Hamilton Almeida, in a 1983 book, states that "the wave transmitter patented by Father Landell in the United States is the precursor of the radio."

Regarding Landell's experiments, in 1993, the Italian work "Tu piccola scatola... La radio: fatti, cose, persone," by Laura De Luca and Walter Lobina, states that he conducted the "first radio transmission of which there is any record. The municipality of São Paulo witnessed the emission and reception of electromagnetic and luminous waves. Radio was born, but no one noticed.". In the authors' view, the radio did not find an environment in the country where it could develop. According to Professor Luiz Artur Ferraretto from UFRGS, with the experiences of 1899 and 1900, "Father Landell came close to what, more than a decade later, was named broadcasting." Meanwhile, as Claudia Zaltrão acknowledges, Landell's name and his work remain forgotten in his own country and abroad, while Almeida notes that in life, Landell's invention received recognition from inventors in the USA.

=== Replics ===
In 1984, the Fundação de Ciência e Tecnologia (Cientec), from Rio Grande do Sul, after three months of work by engineer Antonio Carlos Solano and technicians José Clóvis Totel and Antônio Felipe Pepe, presented a functional replica of the Wave Transmitter. One of the many difficulties they faced was understanding the scale of the device and what materials to use in its construction. On 7 September of that year, at the closing of the Semana da Pátria (Week of the Motherland), the replica was presented to the public at an event where Governor Jair Soares conveyed the words "Porto Alegre." In 2004, another functional replica was made by Marco Aurélio Cardoso Moura, after two years of work.

The 1984 replica had a range of up to 50 meters over a wide frequency band, including FM, with Ferraretto noting that at Landell's time the result would have been better due to the absence of external interference. However, it had difficulty reproducing the intonation of the human voice, a problem that led Landell to suggest a code of words for better communication. The 2004 replica had better reception with medium waves, around 540 kHz, in addition to recognizing FM - otherwise, the performance was similar to the 1984 replica.

== Bibliography ==
Primary source

- US 771917A, Roberto Landell de Moura, "Wave-transmitter.", published 1904-10-11, issued 1904-10-11

Articles

- Almeida, Hamilton. "A primeira transmissão de voz por ondas de rádio da história: a façanha de Roberto Landell de Moura, padre-cientista brasileiro" (PDF). XIII Encontro Nacional de História da Mídia (in Brazilian Portuguese): 15. ISSN 2175-6945.
- Almeida, Hamilton (2012). "A Longa (e Interminável) construção da biografia do Padre Landell". In Klöckner, Luciano; Cachafeiro, Manolo Silveiro (eds.). Por que o Padre Roberto Landell de Moura foi inovador? (PDF) (in Brazilian Portuguese) (1 ed.). Porto Alegre: EdiPUCRS. pp. 17–37. ISBN 978-85-397-0226-8.
- Almeida, Hamilton (2023-02-13). "Padre Landell: o autor das primeiras transmissões de voz e música por ondas de rádio do mundo". Khronos (in Brazilian Portuguese) (14): 120–143. doi:10.11606/issn.2447-2158.i14p120-143. ISSN 2447-2158.
- Almeida, Hamilton (2024-07-17). "Os 125 anos da primeira transmissão de rádio do mundo". Grupo Amanhã (in Brazilian Portuguese).
- Almeida, Hamilton (2024-10-14). "Padre Roberto Landell de Moura: os 120 anos da patente do Transmissor de Ondas". DiárioZonaNorte (in Brazilian Portuguese).
- Alencar, Marcelo Sampaio de (2012). "O Padre Landell de Moura e a invenção da comunicação sem fio". In Klöckner, Luciano; Cachafeiro, Manolo Silveiro (eds.). Por que o Padre Roberto Landell de Moura foi inovador? (PDF) (in Brazilian Portuguese) (1 ed.). Porto Alegre: EdiPUCRS. pp. 67–74. ISBN 978-85-397-0226-8.
- Bruscato, Gentil César (2012). "Conceitos da Física nos Inventos do Padre Roberto Landell de Moura". In Klöckner, Luciano; Cachafeiro, Manolo Silveiro (eds.). Por que o Padre Roberto Landell de Moura foi inovador? (PDF) (1 ed.). Porto Alegre: EdiPUCRS. p. 131. ISBN 978-85-397-0226-8.
- D'Arisbo, Daltro (2012). "Landell de Moura: Ondas de Rádio nas Transformações no Final do Século XIX". In Klöckner, Luciano; Cachafeiro, Manolo Silveiro (eds.). Por que o Padre Roberto Landell de Moura foi inovador? (PDF) (1 ed.). Porto Alegre: EdiPUCRS. pp. 75–79. ISBN 978-85-397-0226-8.
- Fapesp, Agência (2006-06-20). "Quem inventou o rádio?". Observatório da Imprensa (in Brazilian Portuguese).
- Ferraretto, Luiz Artur (2012). "Roberto Landell de Moura: O Pioneiro Brasileiro das Comunicações". In Klöckner, Luciano; Cachafeiro, Manolo Silveiro (eds.). Por que o Padre Roberto Landell de Moura foi inovador? (PDF) (1 ed.). Porto Alegre: EdiPUCRS. pp. 38–52. ISBN 978-85-397-0226-8.
- Ferreira, Luiz Claudio (2022-05-31). "Cem anos do rádio no Brasil: o padre brasileiro que inventou o rádio". Agência Brasil (in Brazilian Portuguese).
- Rocha, Lucas (2022-09-07). "Landell de Moura: conheça o padre brasileiro que inventou o rádio". CNN Brasil (in Brazilian Portuguese).
- Rybak, James P. (February 2002). "Father Landell de Moura: Brazil's Wireless Telephony Pioneer". The OTB. Vol. 43, no. 1. pp. 66–67, 69.
- Santos, César Augusto Azevedo dos (2003). "Landell de Moura ou Marconi, quem é o pioneiro?" (PDF). XXVI Congresso Brasileiro de Ciências da Comunicação. Universidade do Passo Fundo: 15163.
- Silva, Ana Celina F. da; Loguércio, Cidara; Minuzzo, David K.; Muratore, Eliane; Ramos, Jeanice T.; Crestani, Letíssia; Brito, Luciana; Cachafeiro, Manolo Silveiro; Souza, Michele P.; Giovana, Marlise (2012). "Landell de Moura - O Padre-Inventor". In Klöckner, Luciano; Cachafeiro, Manolo Silveiro (eds.). Por que o Padre Roberto Landell de Moura foi inovador? (PDF) (1 ed.). Porto Alegre: EdiPUCRS. pp. 88–100. ISBN 978-85-397-0226-8.

Newspapers and magazines from the time period

- "O Teleforo". Jornal do Commercio (in Portuguese). Vol. 79, no. 164. 1899-06-14. p. 1.
- "Março". Almanak Litterario e Estatistico do Rio Grande do Sul (in Portuguese). Vol. 15. 1903. p. 32.
- "O Rev. Padre Landell de Moura". A Verdade (in Portuguese). Vol. 1, no. 10. 1903-02-08. p. 4.
- "Telephonia sem fios". Pacotilha (in Portuguese). Vol. XXIV, no. 152. Maranhão. 1904-06-28. p. 1.
- "Phonetic Interrupter for Space Telegraphy". Western Electrician. Vol. XXXV, no. 18. Chicago. 1904-10-29. p. 348.
- "Novos inventos". A Federação. Vol. XXII, no. 73. 1905-03-27. p. 1.

Monography

- Zaltrão, Claudia Josiani dos Santos (2006). Resgate da Memória Científica Nacional: a Obra do Padre Roberto Landell de Moura (PDF) (monography) (in Brazilian Portuguese). Curitiba: UFP.
- Alencar, Marcelo S. (2003). "The Repercussion of Father Landell de Moura's Inventions". Historical Evolution of Telecomunications in Brazil (Thesis). Universidade Federal de Campina Grande. pp. 63–71.

Books

- Almeida, Hamilton (2006). Padre Landell de Moura: Um Herói sem Glória (in Brazilian Portuguese) (1 ed.). Rio de Janeiro: Editora Record. p. 319. ISBN 85-01-07260-5. LCCN 2007315336. OCLC 124027826. OL 31764290M.
- Dias, Artur (1917). The Brazil of To-day (1 ed.). Nivelles, Lanneau & Despret. p. 628.
- Zimmer, Ianker (2020-12-17). A filosofia do fracasso. Viseu. ISBN 9786556744766.

Additional reading

- "Patent n. 3279, of March 9, 1901". Translated by Arsenio Fornaro. Archived from the original on 2016-03-05.
- Teixeira, Ricardo Luiz Perez; Shitsuka, Ricardo (2024-04-27). "Father Roberto Landell de Moura and his contribution in the history of science and mobile communications" [Padre Roberto Landell de Moura e a sua contribuição na história da ciência e das comunicações móveis]. Concilium (in Brazilian Portuguese). 24 (7): 492–506. doi:10.53660/CLM-3284-24H08. ISSN 0010-5236.
- Lima, Carlos Guerra (2012). "Padre Landell de Moura e o Primeiro Transmissor-Receptor de Voz sem Fio". In Klöckner, Luciano; Cachafeiro, Manolo Silveiro (eds.). Por que o Padre Roberto Landell de Moura foi inovador? (PDF) (1 ed.). Porto Alegre: EdiPUCRS. pp. 109–122. ISBN 978-85-397-0226-8.
