= Werenskioldbreen =

Glacier in Svalbard, Norway

Coordinates: 77.075°N 15.344°E

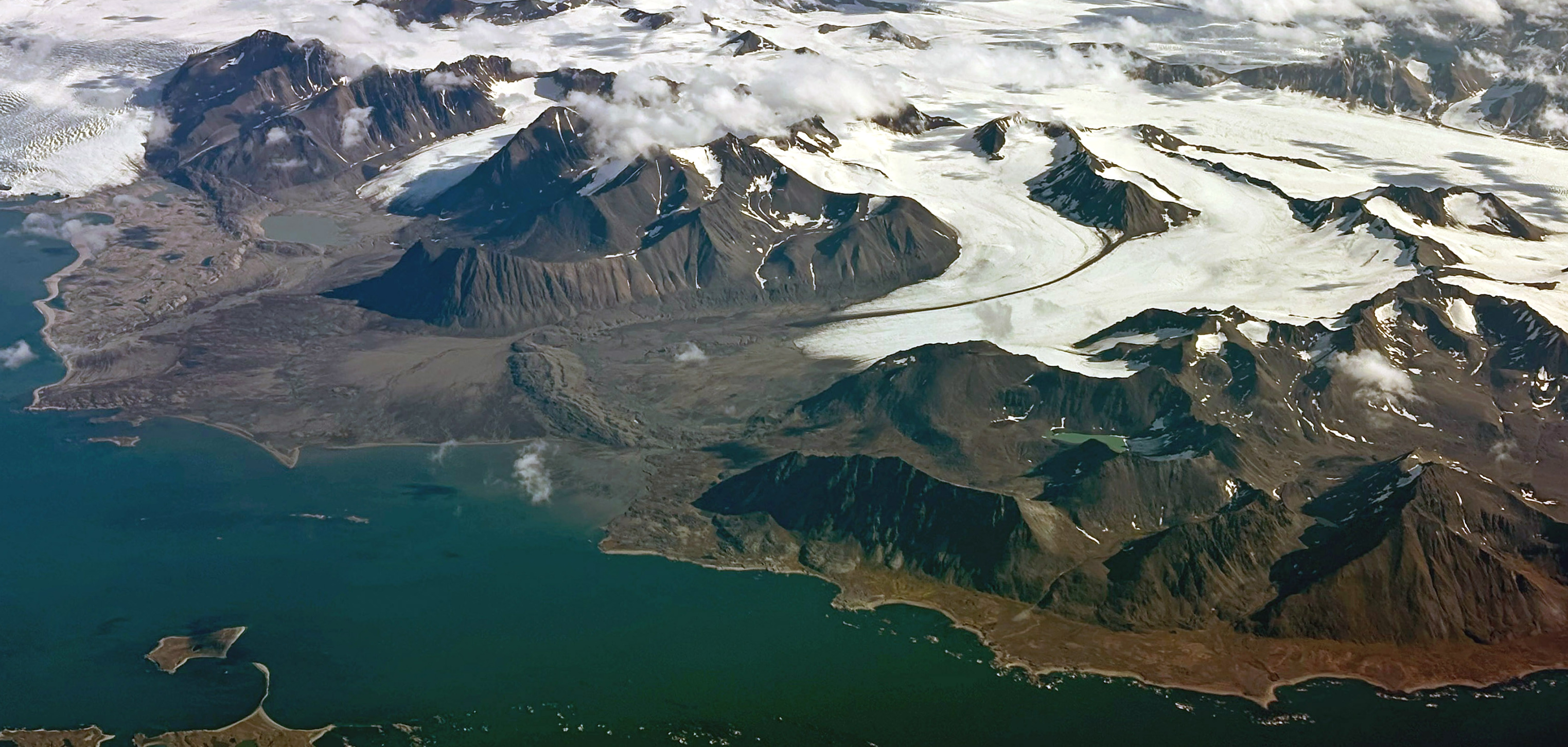
Elveflya plain, Skilryggbreen, mountain Glasiologknausen, Werenskioldbreen

Werenskioldbreen is a glacier in Wedel Jarlsberg Land, Svalbard, Norway. The glacier is named after Norwegian geologist and Arctic explorer Werner Werenskiold.

It is situated adjacent to the glaciers of Hansbreen and Deileggbreen, which are divided from Werenskioldbreen by the mountain ridge of Deilegga.

The glacier has an area of about 30 square kilometers. In 1936 it had a length of about 8.5 kilometers, diminishing on average 30 meters annually between 1936 and 1974. It has a maximum thickness of 235 meters and an average thickness of 96 meters, based on radar measurements.

== See also ==
- Stanisław Baranowski Spitsbergen Polar Station
