= New Phone Who Dis =

New Phone Who Dis may refer to:

- "New Phone Who Dis?", a song by Shea Couleé from the 2023 album 8
- "New Phone (Who Dis)", a single by Cakes da Killa

== See also ==
- Phone (disambiguation)
