= Telefon Point =

Peninsula in Antarctica

Telefon Point (62°14′S 58°28′W) is a point west of the entrance to Admiralty Bay, 2 miles (3.2 km) southwest of Demay Point, King George Island. Named in 1977 by United Kingdom Antarctic Place-Names Committee (UK-APC) in association with Telefon Rocks, which lie offshore east of this point.
