= Tonefjellet =

Mountain in Svalbard, Norway

Coordinates: 77.1098°N 15.2997°E

Tonefjellet is a mountain in Wedel Jarlsberg Land at Spitsbergen, Svalbard. It has a height of 937 m.a.s.l., and is located north of Hornsund, near the coastal plain of Elveflya. The mountain is named after Tone Johanne Werenskiold.
