= Holm & Molzen =

- Industry: Ship Management
- Founded: Flensburg, Germany (1865)
- Defunct: 1932
- Headquarters: Flensburg, Germany

Holm & Molzen was a German company principally known for ship management between 1890 and 1932.

== History ==
In the early 19th century the Holm family began to trade in the Flensburg area of Germany. In 1850 they expanded into coal.

In 1865 they formed an alliance with Herman Molzen, hence the company name.

From 1890 to 1932 they were active in ship management. during this period they ordered several ships from the Flensburger Schiffbau-Gesellschaft and others.

The company ceased ship management in 1932 due to the loss of the coal trade following World War I.

A history was published for the company's centenary in 1965.

== Ships ==
Ships that Holm & Molzen are known to have owned and managed include:

- SS Denebola (1899–1918)
- SS Gemma (1888–1906)
- SS Mira (1923–1929)
- SS Taygeta (1893–1931)
- SS Wega (1885–?)
- SS Selnes (1928–1929)
