= Mount Achala =

Peak in the South Shetland Islands, Antarctica

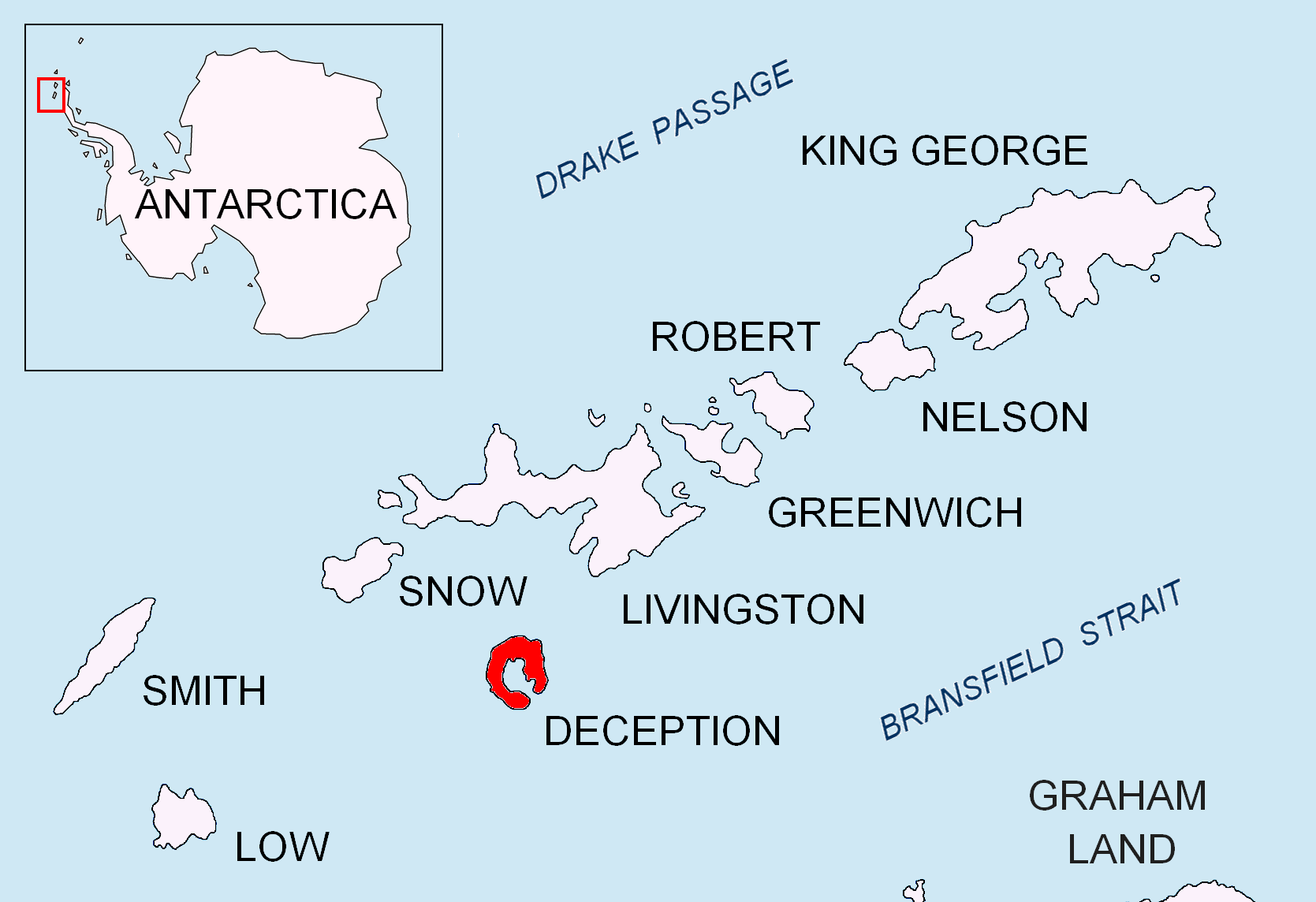
Location of Deception Island in the South Shetland Islands.

Mount Achala (62°55′S 60°42′W) is a peak rising to 680 m at the north end of Telefon Ridge, Deception Island, in the South Shetland Islands. It was named by the Argentine Antarctic Expedition in 1956, after a mountain in Argentina.
