= SS Telefon =

History
- Name: 1900-1911 Telefon; 1911-1913 Kinneil
- Owner: 1900-1908 P. A. Grøn, Sandefjord; 1908-1910 Sociedad Ballenera de Magallanes, Punta Arenas; 1910-1911 The Greenock and Grangemouth Dockyard Co Ltd, Greenock; 1911-1913 Lovart Steamship Co Ltd (Love, Stewart & Co), Bo'ness
- Builder: Wood, Skinner & Company Limited
- Yard number: 87
- Laid down: 1899
- Launched: 30 December 1899
- Completed: February 1900
- Fate: Foundered following collision 30 October 1913

General characteristics
- Tonnage: 1,400 GRT
- Length: 77.9 metres (256 ft)
- Beam: 11 metres (36 ft)
- Depth: 4.8 metres (16 ft)
- Installed power: 144 nhp; 650 indicated horsepower (480 kW)
- Propulsion: Triple-expansion steam engine

SS Telefon was a Norwegian cargo steamship of about 1,400 GRT built by on the River Tyne in 1900. She was wrecked in South Shetland Islands in 1908, though later salved, repaired and returned to service. She was sunk in a collision off Denmark in 1913 as the British Kinneil.

== Description ==
The Telefon was a 1403 gross register ton steel cargo ship built in 1900 by Wood, Skinner & Company Limited at Bill Quay on the River Tyne. She was 77.9 metres (256 ft) length overall, 11 metres (36 ft) beam and 4.8 metres (16 ft) depth. Telefon was launched on 30 December 1899. Her triple expansion engine of 144 nhp or 650 indicated horsepower (480 kW) was supplied by North Eastern Marine Engineers Ltd of Sunderland and Wallsend and drove a single propeller.

== Career ==
The ship was built for P A Grøn of Sandefjord, Norway in 1900 and used to carry cargos to the Antarctic whaling ships of Christen Christensen. On one such voyage, carrying coal and empty barrels from Rotterdam, she struck a reef at the entrance to Admiralty Bay, South Shetland Islands on 26 December 1908. Some sources considered her a total loss as a wreck.

Capt Adolfus Andresen, Norwegian owner of the Sociedad Ballenera de Magallanes of Punta Arenas, Chile which used Deception Island as a whale factory ship base, salved the Telefon, putting her aground at Port Foster, Deception Island, where she was eventually refloated and returned to service with the whaling fleet. That resumption of trading was brief as she was acquired in 1910 by The Greenock & Grangemouth Dockyard Co Ltd of Greenock, transferred to the British flag and registered at Grangemouth. The following year she was sold to the Lovart Steamship Co Ltd, Glasgow, under the management of Love, Stewart & Co, Bo'ness, who renamed her Kinneil

== Fate ==
Kinneil foundered following a collision with the German steamship Denebola on 30 October 1913, 75 miles (121 km) west of the Scaw, Denmark in the Skagerrak, while on voyage from Vilajoki, Finland to Bo'ness carrying pit props. The crew of 18 and the one passenger on board were all rescued.

== Legacy ==
Telefon Bay where she was beached awaiting repair in 1909 and the adjacent Telefon Ridge, on Deception Island, in the South Shetland Islands of Antarctica are both named after the ship.
