= Telefon Rocks =

Group of rocks in Antarctica

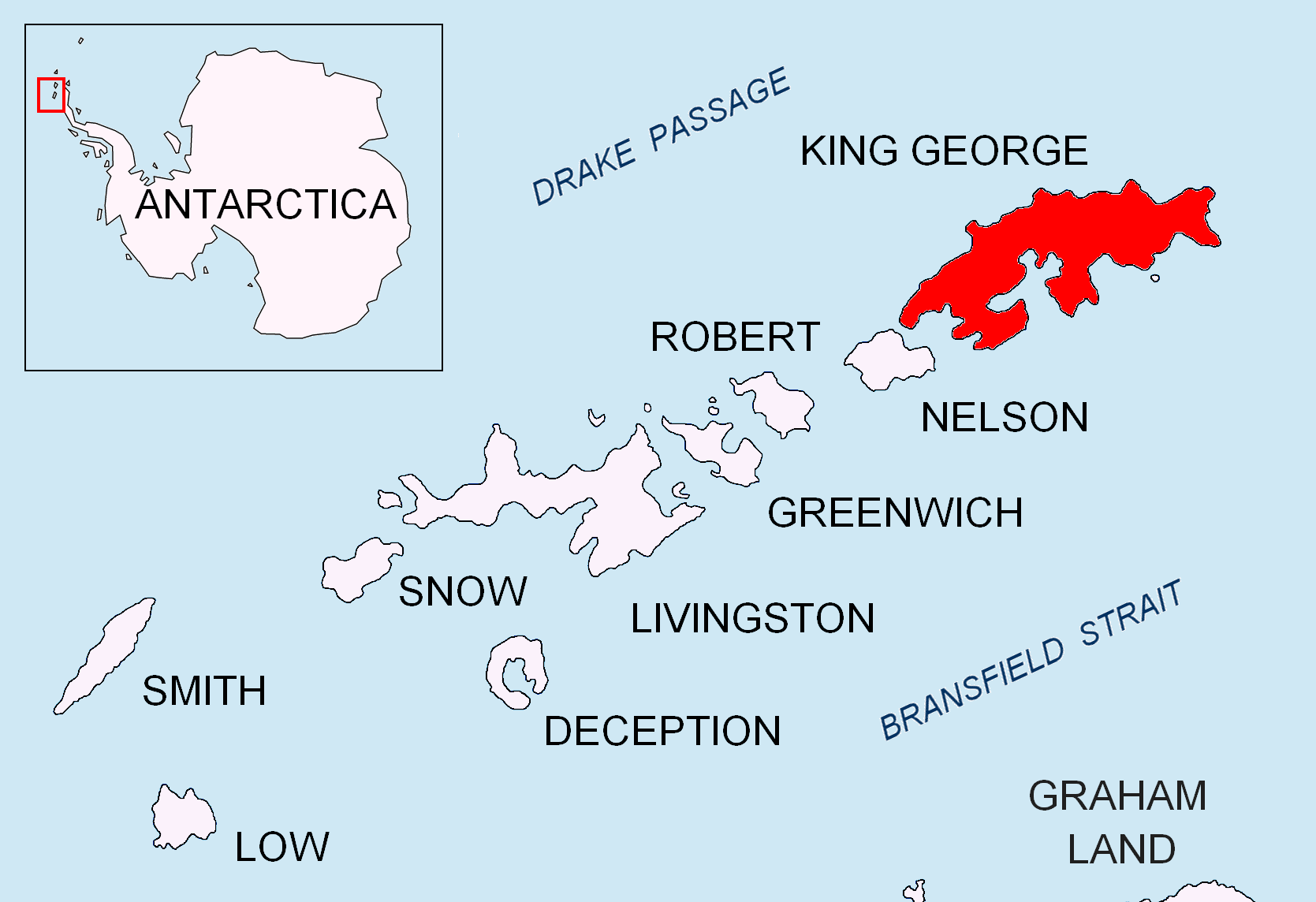
Location of King George Island in the South Shetland Islands.

Telefon Rocks (62°15′S 58°27′W) is a group of rocks 1.5 miles (2.4 km) south-southwest of Demay Point, and just east of Telefon Point, at the west side of the entrance to Admiralty Bay, King George Island, in the South Shetland Islands. Named after the Telefon, a vessel which went aground and was abandoned there in 1908.
