= Baranowski Glacier =

Glacier in Antarctica

- Map of King George Island

- Location within South Shetland Islands Location within Antarctica
- Location: King George Island; South Shetland Islands
- Coordinates: 62°12′S 58°27′W
- Thickness: unknown
- Terminus: Admiralty Bay
- Status: unknown

Baranowski Glacier (62°12′S 58°27′W) is a glacier flowing east into Admiralty Bay, King George Island, northwest of Demay Point. It was named by the Polish Antarctic Expedition after Stanisław Baranowski (1935–78), Polish glaciologist who died on King George Island as a result of an accident at the Henryk Arctowski Polish Antarctic Station while a member of the 1977–78 expedition.

== See also ==
- List of glaciers in the Antarctic
- Glaciology
