= Stanisław Baranowski =

Stanisław Baranowski (25 March 1935 – 27 August 1978) was a Polish glaciologist and leader or member of a number of scientific expeditions to Spitsbergen and Antarctica. He died as a result of an accident near the Henryk Arctowski Polish Antarctic Station while on expedition. At the time of his death, he was head of the Department of Metereology and Climatology at the University of Wrocław. Stanisław Baranowski Spitsbergen Polar Station and Baranowski Glacier are named after him.

== Biography ==
Stanisław Baranowski was born in Gdynia, Poland on 25 March 1935 and graduated from the University of Wrocław in 1955. He carried out studies in glaciology and climatology and participated in many polar expeditions, beginning with the expedition to Spitsbergen during the International Geophysical Year (1957–1958). Subsequently, he organized and led a number of Polish expeditions to that region, as well as to Canada, Iceland and the Sudety Mountains in Poland. He wrote over fifty scientific articles and papers. In 1971, he became a docent and the head of the Department of Metereology and Climatology at the University of Wrocław. He received his habilitation in 1976.

In January 1978, while sleeping near the Henryk Arctowski Polish Antarctic Station on King George Island in the South Shetland Islands, he was poisoned by gas escaping from a leaking cylinder. Despite receiving medical treatment, he never regained consciousness and died in a hospital in Bytom, Poland on 27 August 1978. His obituary, published in the Journal of Glaciology, stated the following: "Stanisław Baranowski was widely known and universally liked, and it is especially tragic that he died so young and while at the height of his creative powers."

The polar station he had founded in Spitsbergen was named the Stanisław Baranowski Spitsbergen Polar Station in his memory. A commemorative plaque has been put up at the Henryk Arctowski Polish Antarctic Station where he suffered his accident. The Baranowski Glacier is also named after him.
