= Nottinghambukta =

Bay of Svalbard

Coordinates: 77.0750°N 15.1074°E

Nottinghambukta is a bay in Wedel Jarlsberg Land at the western coast of Spitsbergen, Svalbard. It is located south of the coastal plain of Elveflya, and inside of Dunøyane.
