= Isbjørnhamna =

Bay in Svalbard, Norway

Coordinates: 77.0000°N 15.5833°E

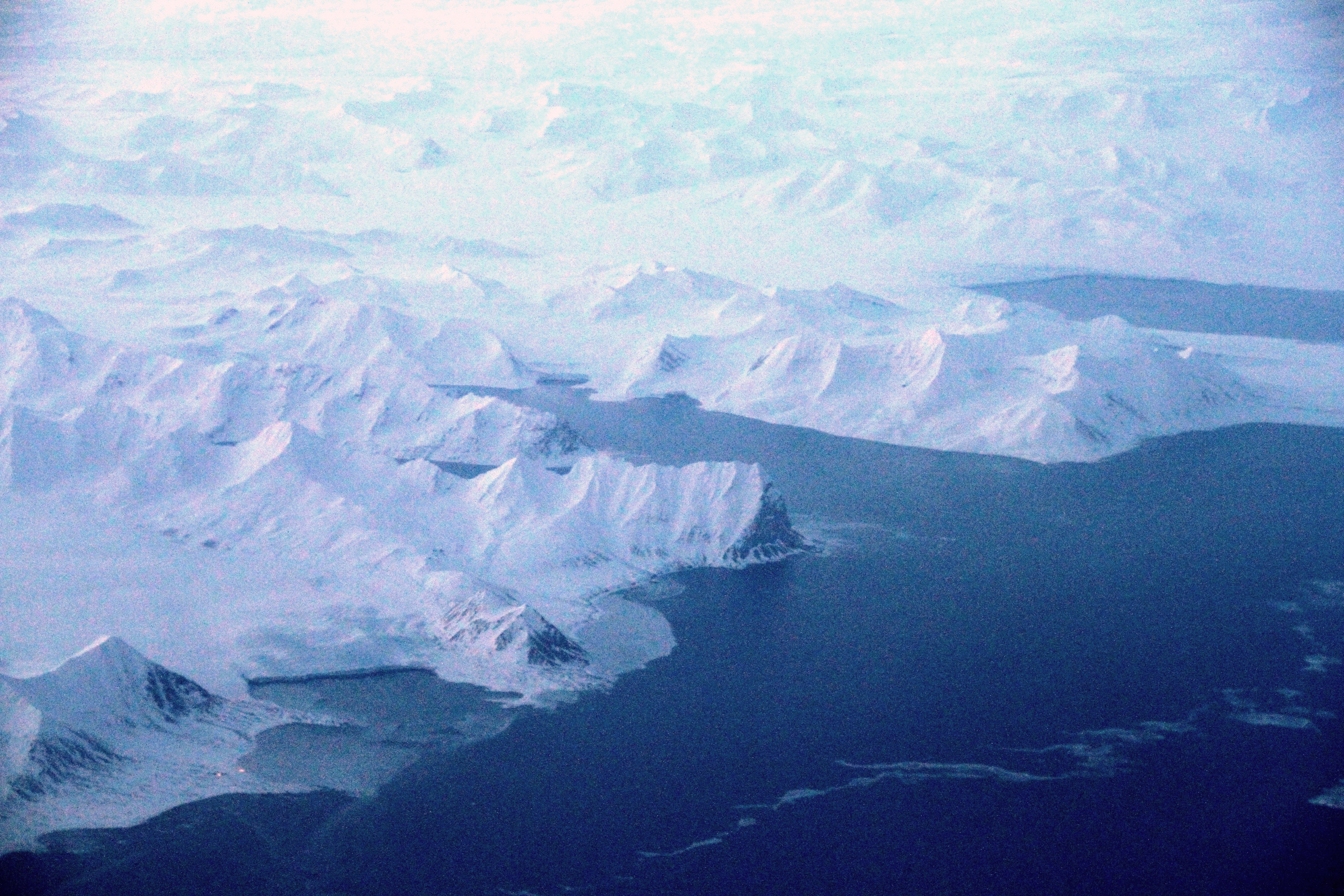
Aerial view of Isbjørnhamna, a glacial bay of Svalbard, Norway.

Isbjørnhamna is a bay in Wedel Jarlsberg Land at Spitsbergen, Svalbard. It is located between Wilczekodden and Hansbreen, at the northern side of Hornsund. The bay is named after the Norwegian sealing vessel Isbjørn. A Polish Polar Station is located in Isbjørnhamna.
