= SS Denebola (1899) =

History
- Name: Denebola
- Owner: Everett & Newbigin
- Builder: Neptun Werft AG
- Laid down: 1899
- Fate: Torpedoed and sunk by UB-86, 17 August 1918

General characteristics
- Tonnage: 1,481 GRT
- Length: 73.1 metres (240 ft)
- Beam: 11 metres (36 ft)
- Draft: 5.2 metres (17 ft)
- Installed power: 133 nhp
- Propulsion: Triple-expansion steam engine

SS Denebola was a 1,481 GRT cargo steam ship built by Neptun Werft of Rostock, Germany, in 1899 and powered by a triple-expansion steam engine of 133 nhp. She carried a crew of 21.

== Ownership ==
- Holm & Molzen of Flensburg
- Everett & Newbegin of Newcastle-upon-Tyne

== Incidents ==
On 30 October 1913, she collided with SS Kinneil 75 miles (121 km) west of the Scaw; Kinneil subsequently foundered.

== Fate ==
Denebola was torpedoed by German submarine SM UB-86 on 17 August 1918 while en route from Swansea bound for Rouen. While passing 2 miles (3.2 km) N by W from Gurnard Head near St Ives, Cornwall she was struck by two torpedoes which hit near number two and three holds, causing her to sink rapidly. The crew took to a boat and a raft and were later picked up by a patrol vessel. The second engineer and one able seaman were lost.
