= The Telephone =

The Telephone may refer to:

- The Telephone (opera), a 1947 English-language comic opera by Gian Carlo Menotti
- The Telephone (1910 film), an American silent black and white drama film
- The Telephone (1956 film), an Australian television play
- The Telephone (1988 film), a comedy-drama film starring Whoopi Goldberg

== See also ==
- Telephone (disambiguation)
