= Mount Uritorco =

Mountain on Deception Island, South Shetland Islands

Coordinates: 62°56′S 60°43′W

Mount Uritorco is a mountain surmounting the southern part of Telefon Ridge on Deception Island in the South Shetland Islands. The name appears on an Argentine chart of 1956.
