= Elveflya =

Coastal plain of Spitsbergen, Norway

Coordinates: 77.1000°N 15.1199°E

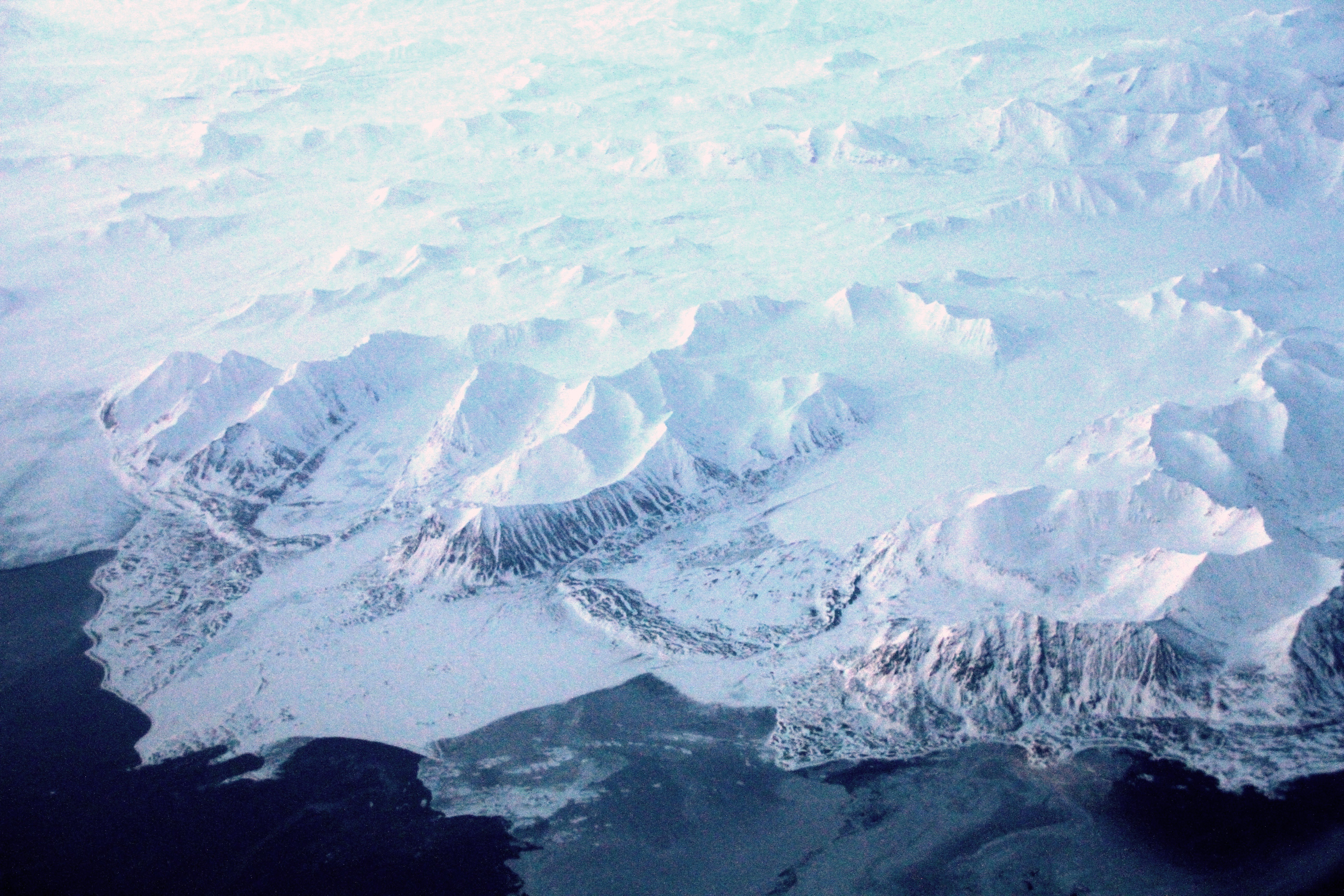
Aerial view from the west towards east, of the west coast of Wedel Jarlsberg Land, Spitsbergen (Norway)

Elveflya (The River Plain) is a coastal plain in Wedel Jarlsberg Land at Spitsbergen, Svalbard. It is located between Nottinghambukta and the front of Torellbreen, west of the mountain Tonefjellet. The plain has a width of about five kilometers, and is characterized by moraine deposits and rivers.
