= Telephone game (game theory) =

The Telephone game is an example of a coordination game potentially having more than one Nash equilibrium proposed by David Lewis. The game was based on a convention in Lewis's home town of Oberlin, Ohio that when a telephone call was cut off then the caller would redial the callee.

== Equilibrium analysis ==
This game involves two players in a town having a telephone service with only one telephone line that cuts callers off after a set period of time (e.g., five minutes) if their call is not completed. Assuming one player (the caller) calls a second player (the callee) and is cut-off, then the players will have two potential strategies - wait for the other to dial them back, or redial to call the other. If both players wait, then no call will be completed, resulting in zero benefit to either player. If both players call each other, then they will get a busy signal, again, resulting in zero benefit to either party. In a simple case where the cost of calling is negligible then it is equally optimal for both parties for one of the caller and the callee to wait whilst the other redials (represented as a benefit of 10 for both parties in Fig. 1) and as such this is a pure coordination game.

	Wait	Redial
Wait	0, 0	10, 10
Redial	10, 10	0, 0
Fig. 1: Telephone Game

In a more complex version of the game (Fig. 2), if the cost of calling is high, then the players will prefer the waiting strategy with its resulting deadlock. If one player calls and the other waits then the player that waits will receive a benefit (say, 6) and the player that calls will receive a lesser benefit as they have to pay the cost of the call (say, 3). In this case there are two potential Nash equilibria.

	Wait	Redial
Wait	0, 0	3, 6
Redial	6, 3	0, 0
Fig. 2: Telephone Game (modified)
