= Phone (name) =

Burmese name list

Phone (Burmese: ဘုန်း; lit. 'glory') is a Burmese name that may refer to:

- Thiri Maha Dhamma Yaza Dipadi Dewi, Burmese queen
- Min Phone Myat (born 1997), Burmese actor
- Myat Hpone Pyo, Burmese royal consort
- Myint Tayzar Phone (born 1978), Burmese sprint canoer
- Nay Phone Latt (born 1980), Burmese blogger and activist
- Phone Maw Shwe, Burmese minister
- Phone Myat, Burmese military officer
- Phone Pyae Han (born 2008), Burmese swimmer
- Phone Thit Sar Min (born 1997), Burmese footballer
- Phone Zaw Han, Burmese city mayor
- Tekkatho Phone Naing (1930–2002), Burmese writer
