= Phone (disambiguation) =

Phone is a colloquial term for a telephone.

Phone may also refer to:

- Phone (name), a Burmese name (including a list of people with the name)
- Phone, a Burmese sociological concept
- Phone (phonetics), a basic unit of composition of which meaningful symbols are built (distinct sound icons in speech, signs for sign language, etc)
- Phone (film), a 2002 South Korean film
- Phone (novel), a 2017 British novel
- Phone (software), a chat application for VMS
- "Phone" (song), a song by Lizzo from her 2016 EP Coconut Oil
- Phones (DJ), British DJ and music producer
- The Phone (film), a 2015 South Korean film
- The Phone (Dutch TV series), a Dutch reality show
- The Phone (American TV series)
- The Phone (Australian TV series)
- Radiotelephony

== Types of phones ==
- Cell phone
- Smart phone
- Cordless phone

== Other ==
- Headphones
- Microphone

== See also ==
- Telephone (disambiguation)
