= Telefone =

Telefone (Portuguese "telephone") may refer to:

- Telefone (mixtape), by Noname
- "Telefone (Long Distance Love Affair)", song by Sheena Easton
- The Telefones, American music group
- José de Almeida Neto, Brazilian footballer known as Telefone
