= Telefon Bay =

Bay along Deception Island, Antarctica

Coordinates: 62°56′S 60°40′W

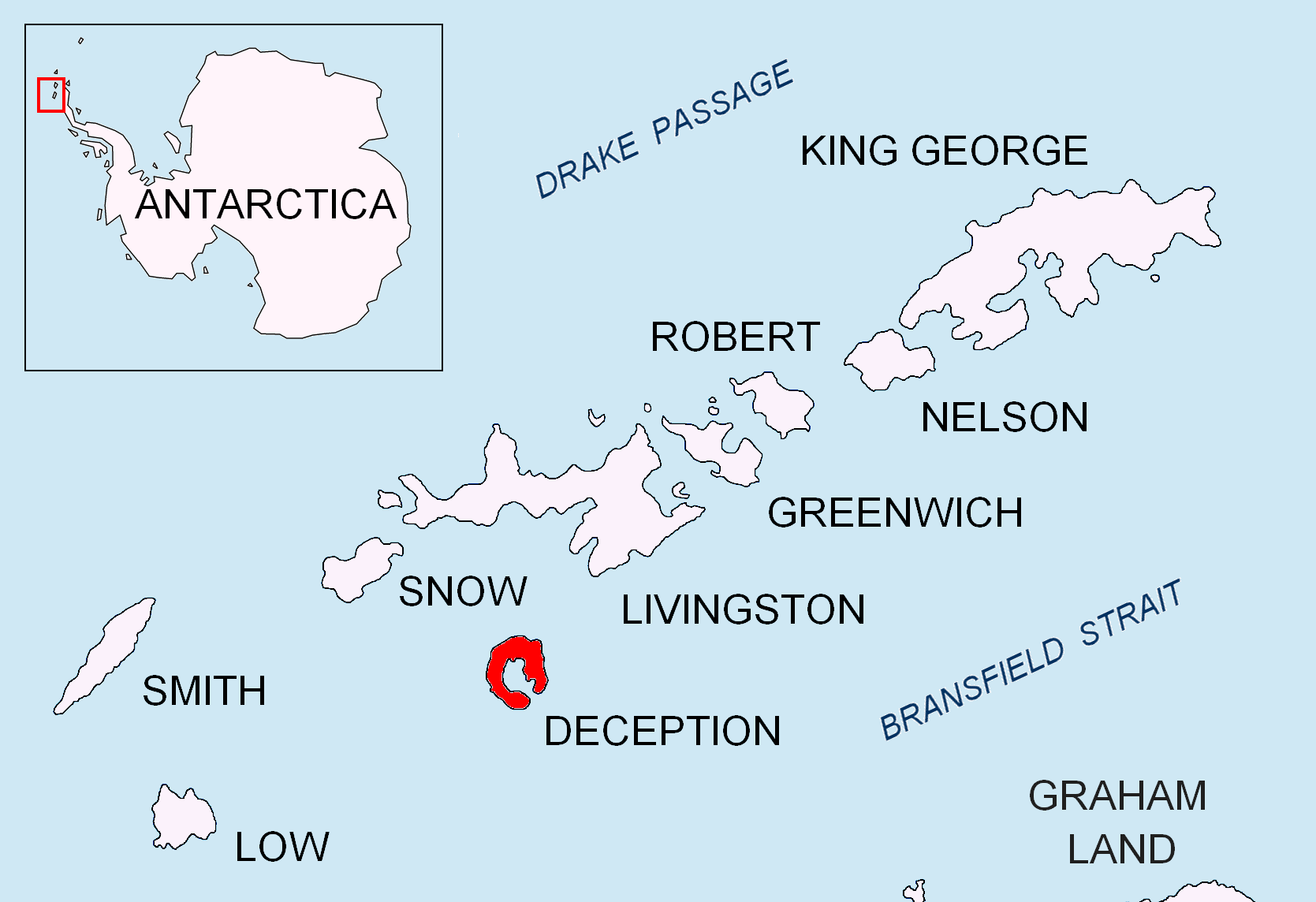
Location of Deception Island in the South Shetland Islands.

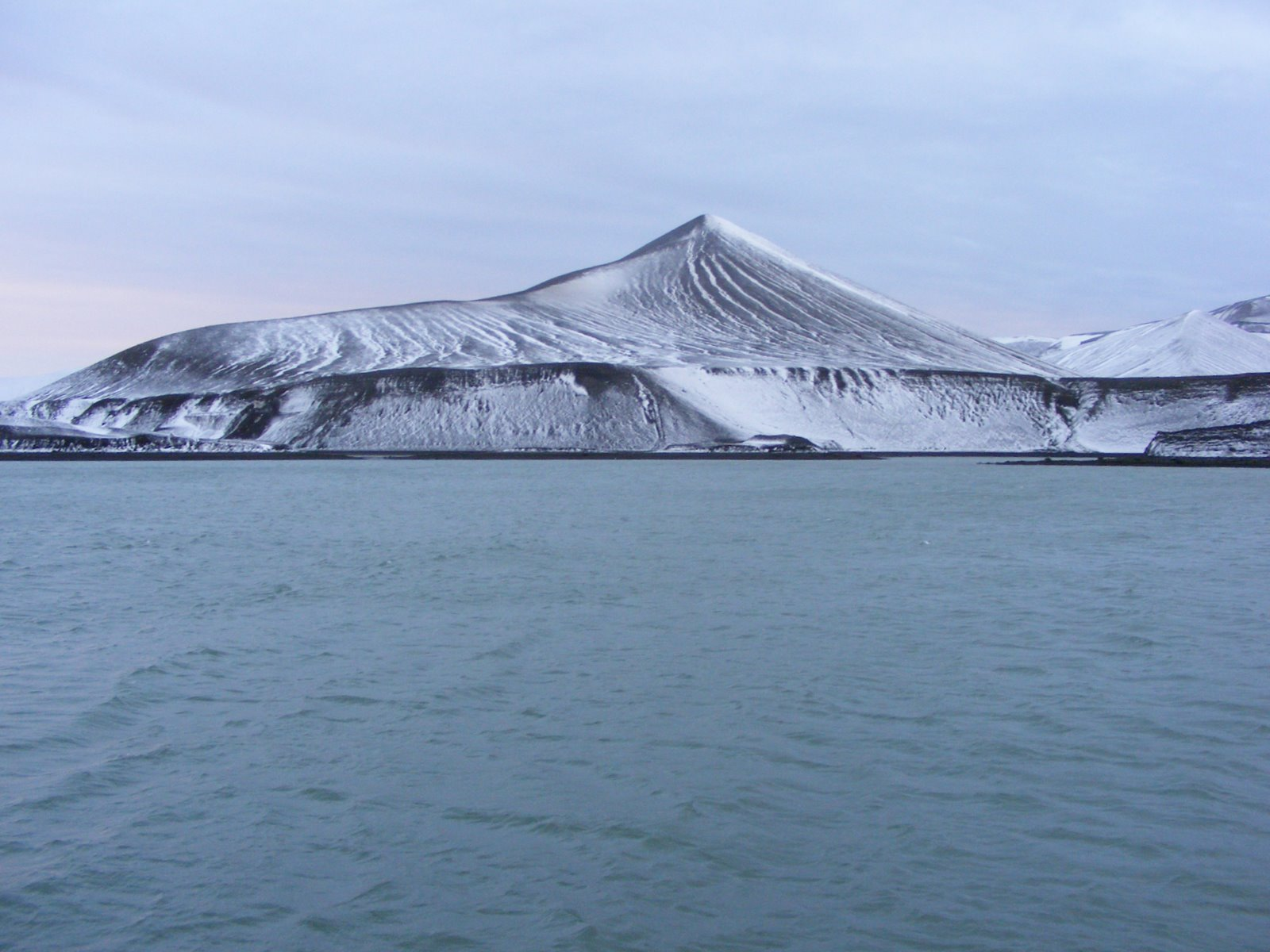
Telefon Bay

Telefon Bay is a small bay on the north-west coast of Port Foster, Deception Island, in the South Shetland Islands of Antarctica. It is surmounted by Telefon Ridge. The name appears on the chart of the French Antarctic Expedition under Charcot, 1908–10.

The name derives from the ship SS Telefon, which was repaired here.

== Antarctic Specially Protected Area ==
The bay forms part of an Antarctic Specially Protected Area (ASPA 140), comprising several separate sites on Deception Island, and designated as such primarily for its botanic and ecological values.
