= SS Selnes =

German-built cargo ship

History
- Name: Gemma (1928–29); Peter Vith (1929–45); Empire Constitution (1945–46); Grannes (1946); Selnes (1946–50)
- Owner: Holm & Molzen (1928–29); H P Vith GmbH (1929–45); Ministry of War Transport (1945); Ministry of Transport (1945–46); Norwegian Government (1946); Einar Wahlstrom (1946–50)
- Operator: Holm & Molzen (1928–29); H P Vith GmbH (1929–45); W A Souter & Co Ltd (1945–46); Norwegian Government (1946); Einar Wahlstrom (1946–50)
- Port of registry: (Weimar Republic) Hamburg (1928); (Weimar Republic) Flensburg (1928–33); (Nazi Germany) Flensburg (1933–45); (United Kingdom) London (1945–46); Norway (1946–50)
- Builder: Flensburger Schiffsbau Gesellschaft
- Launched: 1928
- Identification: Code Letters LNTQ (1928–34); Code Letters DDTV (1934–45); Code Letters GYC (1945–46); United Kingdom Official Number 1806444 (1945–46)
- Fate: Wrecked

General characteristics
- Type: Cargo ship
- Tonnage: 1,593 GRT; 946 NRT
- Length: 262 ft 7 in (80.04 m)
- Beam: 40 ft 3 in (12.27 m)
- Depth: 15 ft 3 in (4.65 m)
- Installed power: Triple expansion steam engine
- Propulsion: Screw propeller

Selnes was a 1,593 GRT cargo ship that was built in 1928 as Gemma by Flensburger Schiffbau-Gesellschaft, Flensburg, Germany for German owners. A sale in 1929 saw her renamed Peter Vith. She was seized by the Allies in May 1945, passed to the Ministry of War Transport (MoWT) and was renamed Empire Constitution. In 1946, she was transferred to Norway and renamed Grannes and then Selnes following a further sale later that year. In 1950, she was involved in a collision in the Thames Estuary and was declared a total loss.

== Description ==
The ship was built in 1928 by Flensburger Schiffbau-Gesellschaft, Flensburg.

The ship was 262 feet 7 inches (80.04 m) long, with a beam of 40 feet 3 inches (12.27 m) and a depth of 15 feet 3 inches (4.65 m). The ship had a GRT of 1,593 and a NRT of 946.

The ship was propelled by a triple expansion steam engine, which had cylinders of 15 3/8 inches (39 cm), 25 5/16 inches (64.3 cm) and 44 1/16 inches (111.9 cm) diameter by 29 1/2 inches (75 cm) stroke. The engine was built by Flensburger Schiffbau-Gesellschaft.

== History ==
Gemma was built for Holm & Molzen, Hamburg. In 1929, she was sold to H P Vith GmbH, Flensburg and renamed Peter Vith. Her port of registry was Flensburg. The Code Letters LNTQ were allocated. In 1934, her Code Letters were changed to DDTV. On 24 January 1934, Peter Vith was in collision with the German pilot boat Ditmar Köel off the Elbe I Lightvessel in foggy weather. In 1936, Peter Vith was one of 20 ships chartered to transport timber from Leningrad, Soviet Union to Germany.

In May 1945, Memel was seized by the Allies at Flensburg. She was passed to the MoWT and renamed Empire Constellation. Her port of registry was changed to London and she was placed under the management of W A Souter & Co Ltd. The Code Letters GFYC and United Kingdom Official Number 1806444 were allocated. In 1946, Empire Constellation was transferred to Norway, and was renamed Grannes. She was sold later that year to Einar Wahlstrom and renamed Selnes. On 26 November 1950, Selnes was in collision with the City of Bristol off the West Barrow Buoy in the Thames Estuary. Although she was beached on the West Barrow Sands, she was declared a total loss.
