= Photophone =

Device that uses light to transmit speech

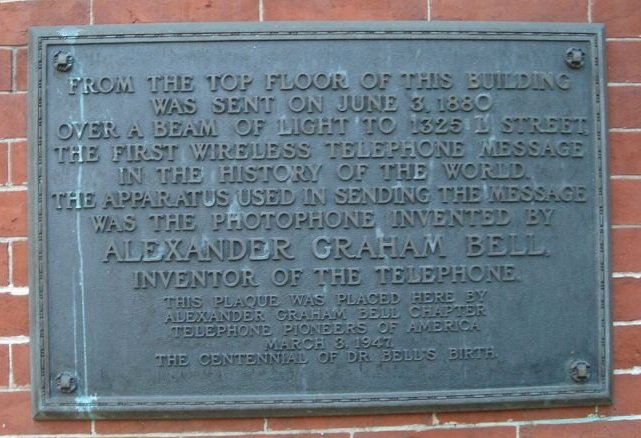
A historical plaque on the side of the Franklin School in Washington, D.C. which marks one of the points from which the photophone was demonstrated

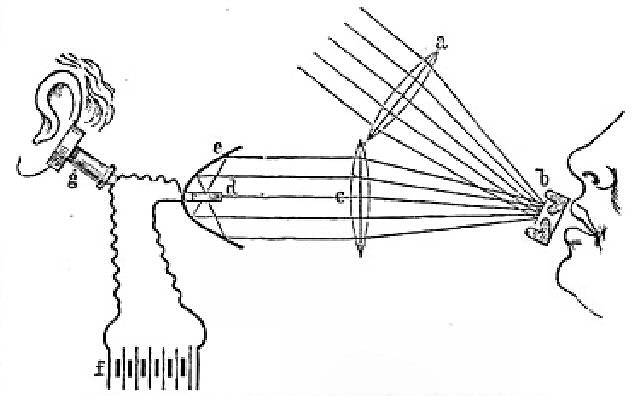
A diagram from one of Bell's 1880 papers

The photophone is a telecommunications device that allows transmission of speech on a beam of light. It was invented jointly by Alexander Graham Bell and his assistant Charles Sumner Tainter on February 19, 1880, at Bell's laboratory at 1325 L Street NW in Washington, D.C. Both were later to become full associates in the Volta Laboratory Association, created and financed by Bell.

On June 3, 1880, Bell's assistant transmitted a wireless voice telephone message from the roof of the Franklin School to the window of Bell's laboratory, some 213 meters (about 700 ft.) away.

Bell believed the photophone was his most important invention. Of the 18 patents granted in Bell's name alone, and the 12 he shared with his collaborators, four were for the photophone, which Bell referred to as his "greatest achievement", telling a reporter shortly before his death that the photophone was "the greatest invention [I have] ever made, greater than the telephone".

The photophone was a precursor to the fiber-optic communication systems that achieved worldwide popular usage starting in the 1980s. The master patent for the photophone (U.S. patent 235,199 Apparatus for Signalling and Communicating, called Photophone) was issued in December 1880, many decades before its principles came to have practical applications.

== Design ==
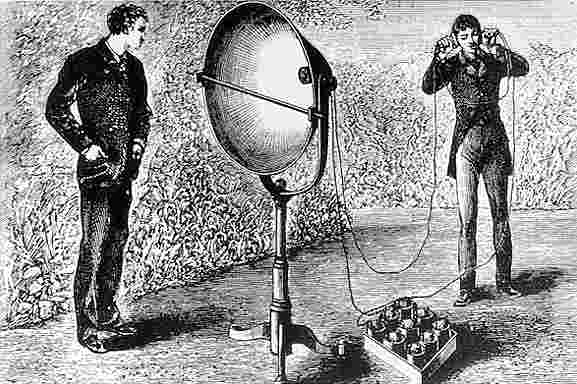
A photophone receiver and headset, one half of Bell and Tainter's optical telecommunication system of 1880

The photophone was similar to a contemporary telephone, except that it used modulated light as a means of wireless transmission while the telephone relied on modulated electricity carried over a conductive wire circuit.

Bell's own description of the light modulator:

We have found that the simplest form of apparatus for producing the effect consists of a plane mirror of flexible material against the back of which the speaker's voice is directed. Under the action of the voice the mirror becomes alternately convex and concave and thus alternately scatters and condenses the light.

The brightness of a reflected beam of light, as observed from the location of the receiver, therefore varied in accordance with the audio-frequency variations in air pressure—the sound waves—which acted upon the mirror.

In its initial form, the photophone receiver was also non-electronic, using the photoacoustic effect. Bell found that many substances could be used as direct light-to-sound transducers. Lampblack proved to be outstanding. Using a fully modulated beam of sunlight as a test signal, one experimental receiver design, employing only a deposit of lampblack, produced a tone that Bell described as "painfully loud" to an ear pressed close to the device.

In its ultimate electronic form, the photophone receiver used a photoresistor based on a selenium cell at the focus of a parabolic mirror. The cell's electrical resistance was higher when dimly lit and lower when brightly lit. Thus, the photoresistor modulated the current flowing through an earphone, and thereby converted light into sound.

In his speech to the American Association for the Advancement of Science in August 1880, Bell gave credit for the first demonstration of speech transmission by light to Mr. A.C. Brown of London in the Fall of 1878.

Because the device used radiant energy, the French scientist Ernest Mercadier suggested that the invention should not be named 'photophone', but 'radiophone', as its mirrors reflected the Sun's radiant energy in multiple bands including the invisible infrared band. Bell used the name for a while but it should not be confused with the later invention "radiophone" which used radio waves.

== First successful wireless voice communications ==
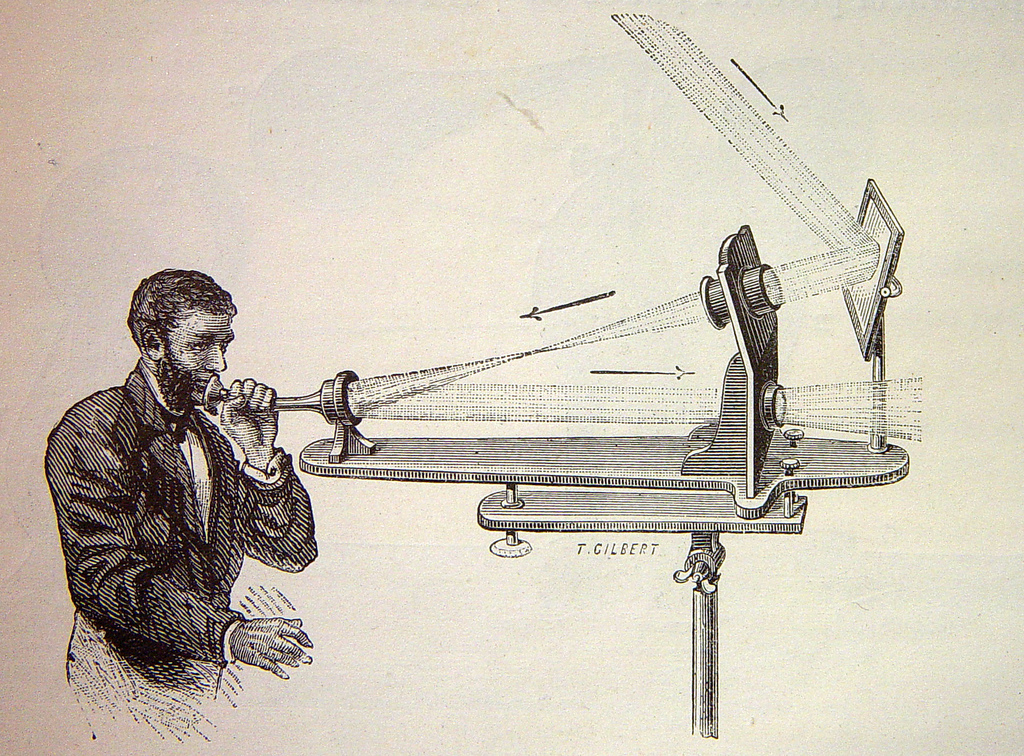
Illustration of a photophone transmitter, showing the path of reflected sunlight, before and after being modulated

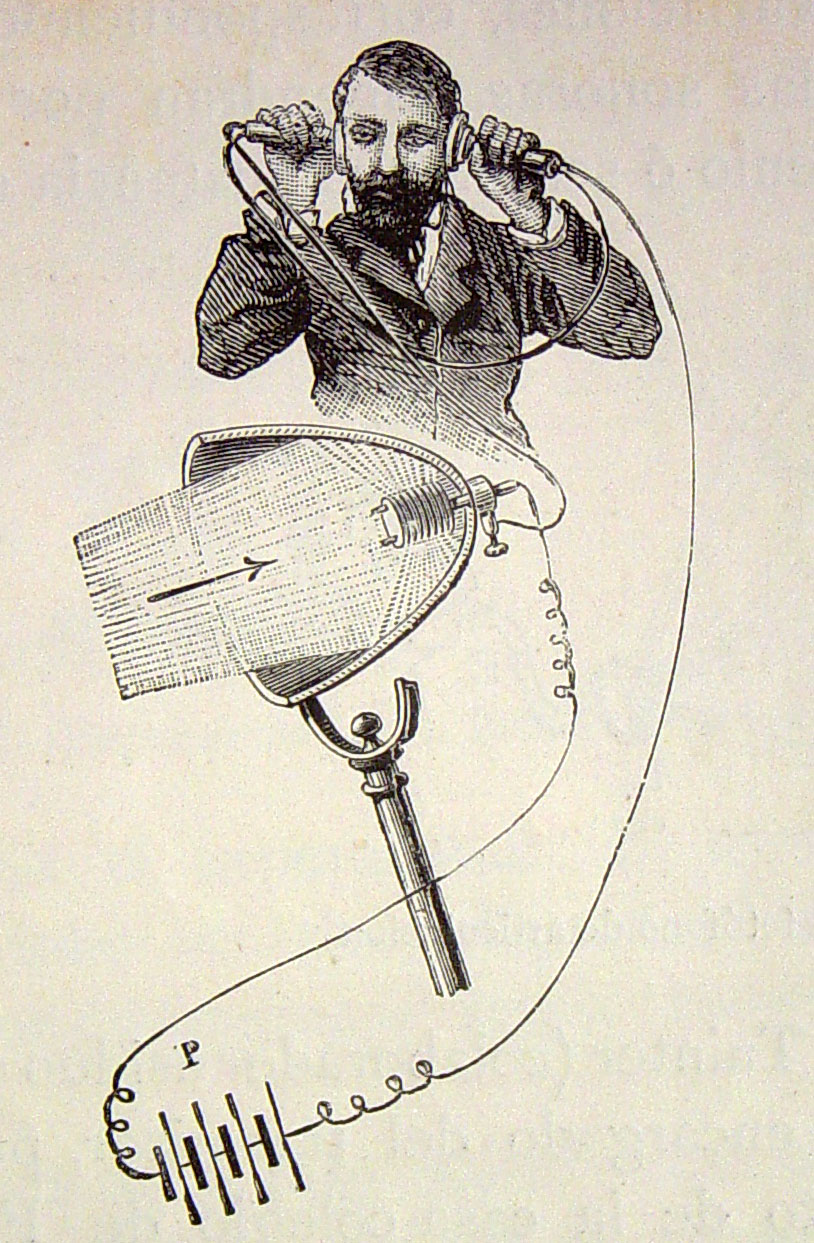
Illustration of a photophone receiver, depicting the conversion of modulated light to sound, as well as its electrical power source (P)

While honeymooning in Europe with his bride Mabel Hubbard, Bell likely read of the newly discovered property of selenium having a variable resistance when acted upon by light, in a paper by Robert Sabine as published in Nature on 25 April 1878. In his experiments, Sabine used a meter to see the effects of light acting on selenium connected in a circuit to a battery. However Bell reasoned that by adding a telephone receiver to the same circuit he would be able to hear what Sabine could only see.

As Bell's former associate, Thomas Watson, was fully occupied as the superintendent of manufacturing for the nascent Bell Telephone Company back in Boston, Massachusetts, Bell hired Charles Sumner Tainter, an instrument maker who had previously been assigned to the U.S. 1874 Transit of Venus Commission, for his new 'L' Street laboratory in Washington, at the rate of $15 per week.

On February 19, 1880, the pair had managed to make a functional photophone in their new laboratory by attaching a set of metallic gratings to a diaphragm, with a beam of light being interrupted by the gratings movement in response to spoken sounds. When the modulated light beam fell upon their selenium receiver Bell, on his headphones, was able to clearly hear Tainter singing Auld Lang Syne.

In an April 1, 1880, Washington, D.C., experiment, Bell and Tainter communicated some 79 metres (259 ft) along an alleyway to the laboratory's rear window. Then a few months later on June 21 they succeeded in communicating clearly over a distance of some 213 meters (about 700 ft.), using plain sunlight as their light source, practical electrical lighting having only just been introduced to the U.S. by Edison. The transmitter in their latter experiments had sunlight reflected off the surface of a very thin mirror positioned at the end of a speaking tube; as words were spoken they cause the mirror to oscillate between convex and concave, altering the amount of light reflected from its surface to the receiver. Tainter, who was on the roof of the Franklin School, spoke to Bell, who was in his laboratory listening and who signaled back to Tainter by waving his hat vigorously from the window, as had been requested.

The receiver was a parabolic mirror with selenium cells at its focal point. Conducted from the roof of the Franklin School to Bell's laboratory at 1325 'L' Street, this was the world's first formal wireless telephone communication (away from their laboratory), thus making the photophone the world's earliest known voice wireless telephone system, at least 19 years ahead of the first spoken radio wave transmissions. Before Bell and Tainter had concluded their research in order to move on to the development of the Graphophone, they had devised some 50 different methods of modulating and demodulating light beams for optical telephony.

== Reception and adoption ==
The telephone itself was still something of a novelty, and radio was decades away from commercialization. The social resistance to the photophone's futuristic form of communications could be seen in an August 1880 New York Times commentary:

The ordinary man ... will find a little difficulty in comprehending how sunbeams are to be used. Does Prof. Bell intend to connect Boston and Cambridge ... with a line of sunbeams hung on telegraph posts, and, if so, what diameter are the sunbeams to be ....[and] will it be necessary to insulate them against the weather ... until (the public) sees a man going through the streets with a coil of No. 12 sunbeams on his shoulder, and suspending them from pole to pole, there will be a general feeling that there is something about Professor Bell's photophone which places a tremendous strain on human credulity.

However at the time of their February 1880 breakthrough, Bell was immensely proud of the achievement, to the point that he wanted to name his new second daughter "Photophone", which was subtly discouraged by his wife Mabel Bell (they instead chose "Marian", with "Daisy" as her nickname). He wrote somewhat enthusiastically:

I have heard articulate speech by sunlight! I have heard a ray of the sun laugh and cough and sing! ...I have been able to hear a shadow and I have even perceived by ear the passage of a cloud across the sun's disk. You are the grandfather of the Photophone and I want to share my delight at my success.

— Alexander Graham Bell, in a letter to his father Alexander Melville Bell, dated February 26, 1880

Bell transferred the photophone's intellectual property rights to the American Bell Telephone Company in May 1880. While Bell had hoped his new photophone could be used by ships at sea and to also displace the plethora of telephone lines that were blooming along busy city boulevards, his design failed to protect its transmissions from outdoor interferences such as clouds, fog, rain, snow and such, that could easily disrupt the transmission of light. Factors such as the weather and the lack of light inhibited the use of Bell's invention. Not long after its invention laboratories within the Bell System continued to improve the photophone in the hope that it could supplement or replace expensive conventional telephone lines. Its earliest non-experimental use came with military communication systems during World War I and II, its key advantage being that its light-based transmissions could not be intercepted by the enemy.

Bell pondered the photophone's possible scientific use in the spectral analysis of artificial light sources, stars and sunspots. He later also speculated on its possible future applications, though he did not anticipate either the laser or fiber-optic telecommunications:

Can Imagination picture what the future of this invention is to be!.... We may talk by light to any visible distance without any conduction wire.... In general science, discoveries will be make by the Photophone that are undreamed of just now.

== Further development ==
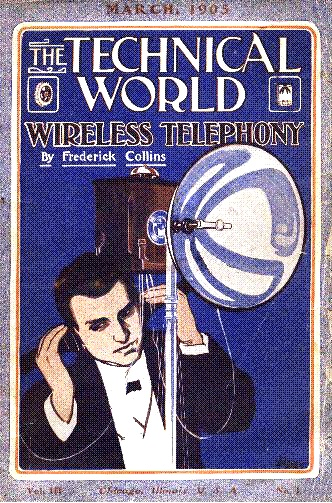
Ernst Ruhmer at his "photo-electric" optical telephone system station. (1905)

Although Bell Telephone researchers made several modest incremental improvements on Bell and Tainter's design, Marconi's radio transmissions started to far surpass the maximum range of the photophone as early as 1897 and further development of the photophone was largely arrested until German-Austrian experiments began at the turn of the 20th century.

The German physicist Ernst Ruhmer believed that the increased sensitivity of his improved selenium cells, combined with the superior receiving capabilities of professor H. T. Simon's "speaking arc", would make the photophone practical over longer signalling distances. Ruhmer carried out a series of experimental transmissions along the Havel river and on Lake Wannsee from 1901 to 1902. He reported achieving sending distances under good conditions of 15 kilometers (9 miles), with equal success during the day and at night. He continued his experiments around Berlin through 1904, in conjunction with the German Navy, which supplied high-powered searchlights for use in the transmissions.

The German Siemens & Halske Company boosted the photophone's range by utilizing current-modulated carbon arc lamps which provided a useful range of approximately 8 kilometres (5.0 mi). They produced units commercially for the German Navy, which were further adapted to increase their range to 11 kilometres (6.8 mi) using voice-modulated ship searchlights.

British Admiralty research during WWI resulted in the development of a vibrating mirror modulator in 1916. More sensitive molybdenite receiver cells, which also had greater sensitivity to infrared radiation, replaced the older selenium cells in 1917. The United States and German governments also worked on technical improvements to Bell's system.

By 1935 the German Carl Zeiss Company had started producing infrared photophones for the German Army's tank battalions, employing tungsten lamps with infrared filters which were modulated by vibrating mirrors or prisms. These also used receivers which employed lead sulfide detector cells and amplifiers, boosting their range to 14 kilometres (8.7 mi) under optimal conditions. The Japanese and Italian armies also attempted similar development of lightwave telecommunications before 1945.

Several military laboratories, including those in the United States, continued R&D efforts on the photophone into the 1950s, experimenting with high-pressure vapour and mercury arc lamps of between 500 and 2,000 watts power.

== Commemorations ==
FROM THE TOP FLOOR OF THIS BUILDING
WAS SENT ON JUNE 3, 1880
OVER A BEAM OF LIGHT TO 1325 'L' STREET
THE FIRST WIRELESS TELEPHONE MESSAGE
IN THE HISTORY OF THE WORLD.
THE APPARATUS USED IN SENDING THE MESSAGE
WAS THE PHOTOPHONE INVENTED BY
ALEXANDER GRAHAM BELL
INVENTOR OF THE TELEPHONE
THIS PLAQUE WAS PLACED HERE BY
ALEXANDER GRAHAM BELL CHAPTER
TELEPHONE PIONEERS OF AMERICA
MARCH 3, 1947
THE CENTENNIAL OF DR. BELL'S BIRTH

— Marker on the Franklin School commemorating the first formal trial

On March 3, 1947, the centenary of Alexander Graham Bell's birth, the Telephone Pioneers of America dedicated a historical marker on the side of one of the buildings, the Franklin School, which Bell and Sumner Tainter used for their first formal trial involving a considerable distance. Tainter had originally stood on the roof of the school building and transmitted to Bell at the window of his laboratory. The marker did not acknowledge Tainter's scientific and engineering contributions.

On February 19, 1980, exactly 100 years to the day after Bell and Tainter's first photophone transmission in their laboratory, staff from the Smithsonian Institution, the National Geographic Society and AT&T's Bell Labs gathered at the location of Bell's former 1325 'L' Street Volta Laboratory in Washington, D.C. for a commemoration of the event.

The Photophone Centenary commemoration had first been proposed by electronics researcher and writer Forrest M. Mims, who suggested it to Dr. Melville Bell Grosvenor, the inventor's grandson, during a visit to his office at the National Geographic Society. The historic grouping later observed the centennial of the photophone's first successful laboratory transmission by using Mims hand-made demonstration photophone, which functioned similar to Bell and Tainter's model. (Note: The demonstration model was a replica in principle but not identical to Bell and Tainter's model. The commemorative model transmitter was a thin mirror cemented to a short aluminum speaking tube, and its receiver was a silicon solar cell and audio amplifier, both installed in a lantern light housing.)

Mims also built and provided a pair of modern hand-held battery-powered LED transceivers connected by 100 yards (91 m) of optical fiber. The Bell Labs' Richard Gundlach and the Smithsonian's Elliot Sivowitch used the device at the commemoration to demonstrate one of the photophone's modern-day descendants. The National Geographic Society also mounted a special educational exhibit in its Explorer's Hall, highlighting the photophone's invention with original items borrowed from the Smithsonian Institution.

== See also ==
- Atomic line filter
- Free-space optical communication
- History of telecommunication
- Laser microphone
- Mie scattering
- Modulating retro-reflector
- Optical sound
- Optical window
- Photoacoustic effect
- Radio window
- Rayleigh scattering
- Semaphore line
- Visible light communication
- Volta Laboratory and Bureau
