= Telefon Ridge =

Ridge in Antarctica

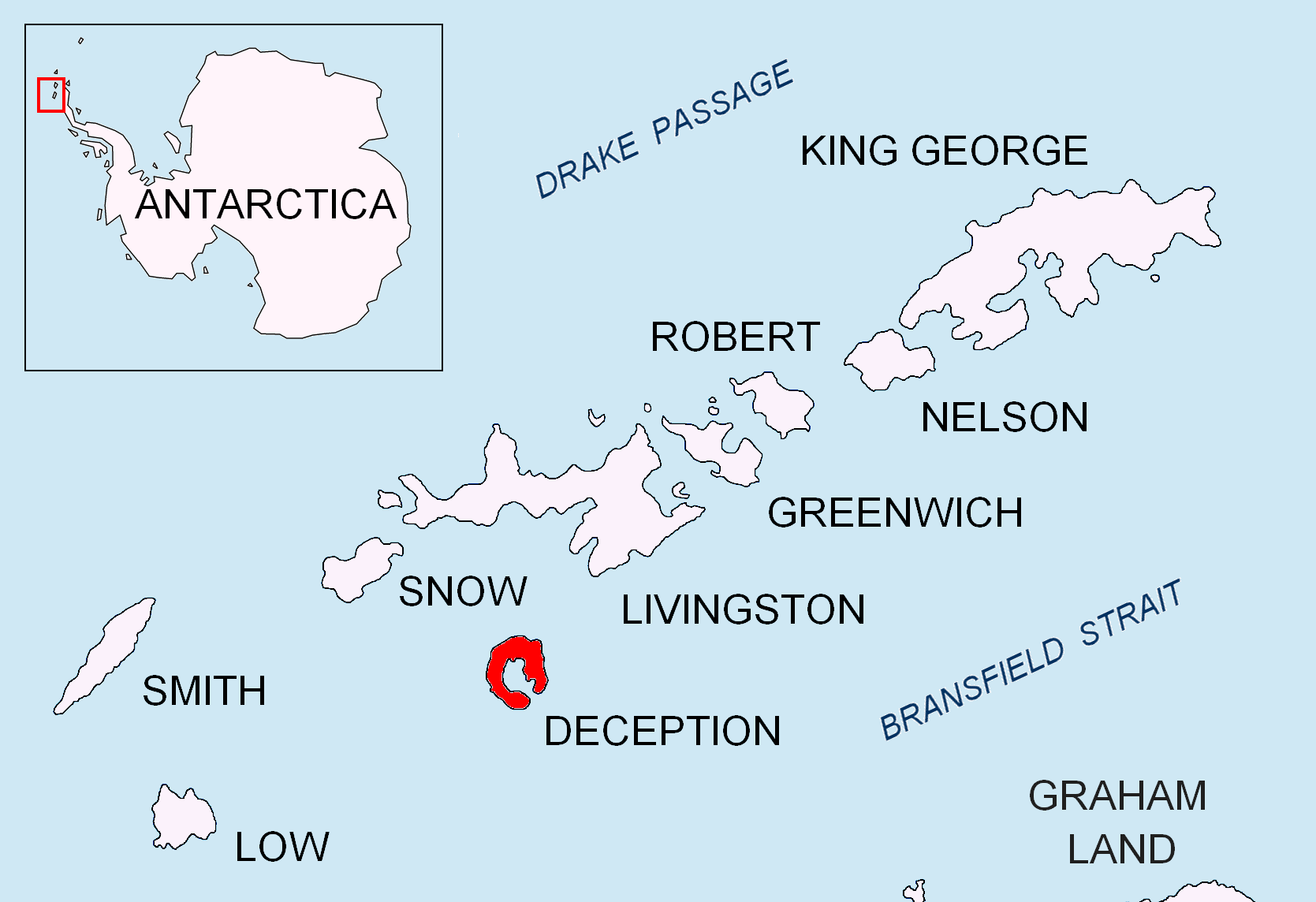
Location of Deception Island in the South Shetland Islands.

Telefon Ridge (62°56′S 60°43′W) is a ridge rising west of Telefon Bay on Deception Island, in the South Shetland Islands. Named from association with Telefon Bay by the United Kingdom Antarctic Place-Names Committee (UK-APC) in 1959.

== Peaks ==
- Mount Uritorco
- Mount Achala (680m)
