= Hansbreen =

Glacier in Svalbard, Norway

Coordinates: 77.06°N 15.64°E

Hansbreen is a glacier in Wedel Jarlsberg Land at Spitsbergen, Svalbard. It covers an area of about 64 km^{2} and has a length of fifteen kilometers. The glacier is located north of Hornsund and approaches the sea near Isbjørnhamna. It is named after Austrian nobleman Hans Rafael Wilczek. The glacier has been subject for studies of climatic effects, as one out of four selected glaciers at Svalbard.
