= Demay Point =

Coordinates: 62°13′S 58°26′W

Demay Point is a headland which forms the west side of the entrance to Admiralty Bay, King George Island, in the South Shetland Islands. This point was known to sealers as early as 1822. It was named almost 100 years later by the French Antarctic Expedition, 1908–10, under Jean-Baptiste Charcot. It has a Polish refuge, but it is unclear whether the refuge is being used at all.
