= October 1978 =

Month of 1978

<<	October 1978					>>
Su	Mo	Tu	We	Th	Fr	Sa
1	2	3	4	5	6	7
8	9	10	11	12	13	14
15	16	17	18	19	20	21
22	23	24	25	26	27	28
29	30	31

The following events occurred in October 1978:

October 16, 1978: Archbishop Karol Wojtyla of Poland elected as the first non-Italian Pope in more than 450 years

== October 1, 1978 (Sunday) ==
The flag of Tuvalu

- The nation of Tuvalu, formerly the British colony of the Ellice Islands, became independent from, but remained in association with, the United Kingdom. Sir Toaripi Lauti became the first prime minister of the South Pacific set of islands and Sir Fiatau Penitala Teo became the first Governor-General as representative of the constitutional monarch, Queen Elizabeth II.
- The People's Republic of China and the ruling Chinese Communist Party inaugurated the "Democracy Wall" ( 西单民主墙, Xīdān mínzhǔ qiáng) in Beijing, allowing civilians to freely place their opinions on posters on the city's Xidan Wall, without the prospect of reprisal. The approved Wall was consistent with recommendations made on August 18, 1977 for encouraging limited freedom of speech and debate, with the slogan "To liberate thought, to provide the best service to the people, are the duties of CCP members."
- To defuse the growing public dissent in Iran, Shah Mohammad Reza Pahlavi announced a general amnesty to all dissidents living outside of Iran, including the Ayatollah Khomeini, but the decree came too late to stop the Iranian Revolution.
- Voters in the island nation of the Comoros overwhelmingly approved a new constitution, changing the form of government and renaming their country the "Federal Islamic Republic of the Comoros".
- In eastern India, 88 people were killed when a crowded bus fell into a flooded ravine in the remote South 24 Parganas district of the state of West Bengal. The bus driver was attempting to avoid hitting a cow and ran off of the road.
- In Canada, a fire at the Ripple Cove Inn at Ayer's Cliff, Quebec, killed eight vacationers and left eight others injured and four missing.
- Born: Katie Aselton, American TV actress known for The League; in Milbridge, Maine

== October 2, 1978 (Monday) ==
- Barkat Gourad Hamadou became the new Prime Minister of the African nation of Djibouti, and the fourth in the 16 months since Djibouti had become an independent nation. Hamadou would continue as Prime Minister for more than 20 years before stepping down on March 7, 2001.
- Mamdouh Salem was dismissed as Prime Minister of Egypt by President Anwar Sadat after three years in office, and succeeded by Mustafa Khalil.
- Zastava Automobiles of Yugoslavia produced the first of its popular compact automobiles, the "Yugo", presenting the first model to President Josip Broz Tito.
- American comedian Tim Allen was arrested in Traverse City, Michigan after he and a friend, Gerald Mead, sold 650 grams (1.43 lb) of cocaine to under cover officers of the Michigan State Police. Allen was charged with drug trafficking under his real name, Timothy Alan Dick. Pleading guilty to felony charges and agreeing to become an informant, Allen was sentenced to at least three years in the federal prison in Sandstone, Minnesota and released after serving 28 months. After turning his life around, Allen would go on to success as a comedian, the star of the hit TV sitcom Home Improvement, and a bestselling author.
- Born: Ayumi Hamasaki, Japanese pop singer known as "The Empress of J-pop"; in Fukuoka

== October 3, 1978 (Tuesday) ==
- The crash of a Finnish Air Force DC-3 killed all 15 people aboard. One of the engines stalled shortly after take off from Kuopio to Helsinki and the airplane crashed into Lake Juurusvesi. Most of the victims were politicians and prominent businessmen (including three members of Parliament) who were attending a National Defence Course meeting organized by the Finnish Defence Forces. Tarja Halonen, a labor union official who would serve from 2000 to 2012 as the first female President of Finland, had been scheduled to be on the flight but was advised by her physician to cancel because of her pregnancy.
- In France, gunmen shot and killed 10 people and wounded 11 others in the Bar du Téléphone in Marseille, shooting every person in the tavern, apparently in a fight between rival street gangs. At 8:10 pm, the three killers entered the bar, then shot every person within four minutes. While some suspects were arrested and released, no person was ever brought to trial.
- The second birth of a "test tube baby" conceived by in vitro fertilization took place at the Bellevue Nursing Home hospital in Kolkata in India with the arrival of Kanupriya Agarwal, daughter of two members of the Marwari merchant caste, Bela and Pravat Agarwal, following the use of IVF by Dr. Subhash Mukhopadhyay.
- Born:
  - Gerald Asamoah, Ghana-born German footballer with 43 caps for the Germany national team; in Mampong
  - Claudio Pizarro, Peruvian footballer with 85 caps for the Peru national team; in Callao
  - Fredrik Vejdeland, Swedish neo-Nazi and leader of the Nordic Resistance Movement, classified by the U.S. as a Specially Designated Global Terrorist; in Östersund
- Died:
  - Alexander Belov, 26, Soviet basketball player and 1972 Olympic gold medalist, inducted to the FIBA Hall of Fame, died from a cardiac sarcoma, a rare cancer of the heart tissue.
  - Cooper Smeaton, 88, Canadian ice hockey referee and chief of officiating in the National Hockey League from 1917 to 1937, later inducted into the Hockey Hall of Fame

== October 4, 1978 (Wednesday) ==
- The funeral of Pope John Paul I was held in Saint Peter's Square in Rome.
- The FBI arrested two men who had furnished detailed plans to an undercover agent whom they were attempting to recruit for a 12-man crew, with a goal of stealing the U.S. Navy attack submarine USS Trepang (SSN-674), equipped with nuclear missiles, from its base in New London, Connecticut. According to the plan, given to the FBI agent at a meeting in St. Louis, the men planned to board a sub tender at New London, use plastique explosives to sink it and block the harbor, and possibly to fire a nuclear missile at New London or another U.S. city. U.S. Navy Rear Admiral David Cooney commented, "No 12 people off the street are ever going to operate a submarine like this."
- Born: Phillip Glasser, American voice actor best known for voicing Fievel Mousekewitz in An American Tail and its sequels; in Tarzana, California
- Died: Rocky Dennis, 16, American teenager who had craniodiaphyseal dysplasia who became the basis for the 1985 film Mask.

== October 5, 1978 (Thursday) ==
- Sweden's Prime Minister Thorbjörn Fälldin announced his resignation along with his cabinet of ministers after a disagreement on whether Sweden should build two additional nuclear reactors to join the six already operating. His coalition of the Center, Conservative and Liberal parties had been elected in 1976 as the first government since 1932 not to include the Social Democrats. "All parties in a coalition must be able to compromise," Fälldin told reporters, "but no coalition party should demand of another to extinguish its soul." Fälldin's government remained as caretakers until October 18, when a new government was formed by Ola Ullsten.
- The Environmental Modification Convention, signed on May 18, 1977, and meant to ban contemporary and future weather modification technology in warfare, became effective upon ratification by 20 nations.
- The Jesus Is Lord Church, which claims one million members in 60 nations, was founded in Manila by Professor Eddie Villanueva of the Philippine College of Commerce, with 15 students as its members.
- The New York Post became the first of New York City's three major daily newspapers resume publication after News Corp, owned by magnate Rupert Murdoch, reached an agreement with the pressman's union. The Post had last appeared on August 9, the day before the strike against the three dailies.
- Isaac Bashevis Singer, a Polish-born American Jewish writer of short stories, novels and children's books, was announced as the winner of the Nobel Prize in Literature.
- Born: James Valentine, American guitarist for Maroon 5; in Lincoln, Nebraska

== October 6, 1978 (Friday) ==
- During Operation Unitas in Chile, a joint training exercise by the navies of the United States, Peru and Chile, a U.S. Navy R6 transport crashed into a hill while attempting to land at Santiago, killing all 16 people aboard. The airplane was flying at 2,600 feet (790 m) when it hit the side of the 3,000-foot (910 m) high mountain.
- The sudden collapse of a steel cofferdam killed seven construction workers at the Lake Keowee reservoir near Pickens, South Carolina. The men had been inside the temporary watertight structure and 40 feet (12 m) lower than the surface to pump out water to allow work on the water system of Greenville County when the wall collapsed, drowning them. One worker who had been standing on the rim of the cofferdam survived after being washed 100 yards (91 m) out to the edge of the lake.

== October 7, 1978 (Saturday) ==
- In the Soviet Union, all 38 people on Aeroflot Flight 1080 were killed when the Yakovlev Yak-40 crashed shortly after takeoff from Sverdlovsk (now Yekaterinburg) en route to Kostanay. Because the crew had not de-iced the engines, the number one engine stalled and the Yak-40 struck trees on a hillside.
- The Kingdom of Spain enacted a law permitting the sale of contraceptives and other aids to birth control for the first time in Spanish history, repealing all criminal penalties that had forbidden their sale and use.
- The New Zealand Parliament was dissolved by Prime Minister Robert Muldoon, and new elections were scheduled for November 25.
- U.S. Representative Charles Diggs, a Democrat Congressman for Michigan since 1955, was convicted in a federal court in Washington D.C. on 11 charges of mail fraud and filing false payroll forms. He would be re-elected to a 13th term one month later, censured by the House on July 31, 1979 and, after resigning on June 3, 1980 when his convictions were upheld on appeal, begin serving 14 months in prison.
- Born: Bom Kim (Kim Beomseok), South Korean and American businessman and billionaire, founder of the South Korean e-commerce company Coupang; in Seoul
- Died: M. S. Baburaj, 57, Indian film score composer and film score for Malayalam cinema, died of a massive hemorrhagic stroke.

== October 8, 1978 (Sunday) ==
- Australia's Ken Warby set the current world water speed record of 317.59 mph (511.11 km/h) on the Tumut River at the Blowering Dam in New South Wales. Warby was piloting his speed boat Spirit of Australia. The record was still standing more than 45 years later.
- The Brisbane City Azzuri defeated Adelaide City Zebras, 2 to 1, to win the championship of Australia's National Soccer League before an overflow crowd of 6,964 fans at the 5,000 capacity Perry Park in Brisbane, Queensland.
- Died:
  - Jim Gilliam, 49, American baseball player in the Negro Leagues (for the Baltimore Elite Giants and in Major League Baseball for the Dodgers in Brooklyn and Los Angeles, 1953 National League Rookie of the Year, died of a brain hemorrhage.
  - Karl Swenson, 70, American actor on film, television, stage and radio

== October 9, 1978 (Monday) ==
- The Uganda–Tanzania War began in Africa as the Ugandan Army began making the first attacks on Tanzania's Kagera Salient, on order of President Idi Amin. Tanzania would win the war within less than a year and President Amin would be overthrown.
- P.W. Botha succeeded John Vorster as Prime Minister of South Africa.
- Testing began on the Shroud of Turin, said to have been the cloth used to wrap the body of Jesus Christ after his crucifixion, because of an image of Jesus that became visible after the time of his resurrection. The testing ended a 43-day long public display of the shroud at the Turin Cathedral in Italy.
- Born: Nicky Byrne, Irish pop star for Westlife; in Dublin
- Died: Jacques Brel, 48, popular Belgian singer, died of lung cancer.

== October 10, 1978 (Tuesday) ==
- John Vorster, who had recently resigned as Prime Minister, took office as the new State President of South Africa.
- Seasat, the first Earth-orbiting satellite designed for remote sensing of the Earth's oceans, was damaged beyond repair less than four months after it had been launched, after sustaining a massive short circuit in its electrical system.
- U.S. President Jimmy Carter signed a bill that authorized the minting of the Susan B. Anthony dollar.
- Born:
  - Caroline Evers-Swindell and Georgina Evers-Swindell, New Zealand rowers, gold medalists in the 2004 and 2008 Olympics; in Hastings, New Zealand
  - Jyothika (stage name for Jyothika Saravanan), Indian film actress and producer, winner of the National Film Award in Tamil cinema for Soorarai Pottru; in Bombay (now Mumbai)
- Died:
  - Ralph Metcalfe, 68, U.S. Representative for Illinois since 1971 and 1932 Olympic gold medalist, and one-time holder of the world record for the 100-meter dash
  - Hermes Lima, 75, former Prime Minister of Brazil from 1962 to 1963, later a justice of the Brazilian Supreme Court

== October 11, 1978 (Wednesday) ==
- Leo Tindemans, angry over the failure of the Flemish members of his coalition government to support the Egmont pact to create autonomous communities the three separate groups in the Kingdom of Belgium, announced his resignation as Prime Minister. The pact, signed on May 24, 1977, would have established three self-governing regions in Flanders for speakers of Flemish, Wallonia for speakers of French and in the national capital territory of Brussels.
- An indirect presidential election was held in Panama by the 505 members of the Asamblea Nacional de Representantes de Corregimientos (National Assembly of Community Representatives) who had been selected by popular vote of 787,000 registered voters. Arístides Royo, who had been picked as the government candidate by Jefe de Gobierno (Chief of Government) Omar Torrijos, who retained control of the nation as Commander of the Panamanian National Guard, received 452 votes, and Ricardo de la Espriella of the Partido Revolucionario Democrático got 13 and became Vice President. Another 40 votes cast as blank ballots. Royo took office immediately after the vote.
- The Ayatollah Ruhollah Khomeini was granted political asylum in France after being deported from Iraq and being refused asylum in Kuwait. Khomeini settled in the Paris suburb of Neauphle-le-Château after arriving on October 6. The Shah of Iran had sought to have Khomeini exiled to a non-Muslim nation to keep the Shi'ite Islamic religious leader from spreading his calls for rebellion from in Iran.
- Died:
  - Ruthven Todd, 64, Scottish novelist
  - Goodloe Byron, 49, U.S. Representative for Maryland since 1971, suffered a fatal heart attack while jogging with an aide.

== October 12, 1978 (Thursday) ==
- The explosion of an oil tanker killed 76 people and injured 69 others at the Juron Shipyard in Singapore. The Greek ship Spyros was in port for repairs, and the blast happened at 2:15 p.m. local time shortly after 150 Singaporean workers had returned to work after a lunch break. An investigation concluded that careless use of a cutting torch had caused a fire that ignited explosive vapors in the fuel tank at the back of the Spyros, causing the deadliest industrial accident in Singaporean history.
- Punk rock star Sid Vicious (Simon John Ritchie) of the band Sex Pistols was arrested on charges of second-degree murder after his girlfriend, Nancy Spungen, was found dead of a stab wound at the room at New York City's Hotel Chelsea, registered to "Mr. and Mrs. Simon Ritchie", with Spungen's wounds found to be rendered by Vicious's five-inch knife. Vicious was released from custody after posting a $50,000 bond, and died of a heroin overdose four months later before he could come to trial.
- Born: Manuchar Kvirkvelia, Georgian Greco-Roman wrestling champion, 2008 Olympic gold medalist and 2003 world championship gold medalist; in Ozurgeti, Georgian SSR, Soviet Union

== October 13, 1978 (Friday) ==
- The Soviet Union launched a major Russification campaign throughout the other 14 union republics, with the enactment of an unpublished resolution by the Soviet Council of Ministers, titled "On measures to further improve the teaching and learning of the Russian language in the Union Republics". Decree No. 835, mandating the teaching of Russian starting in first grade in non-Russian schools, was soon enacted at the republic level by the Councils of Ministers across the Soviet Union, declared that Russian was a "second native language" and the only means of participation in social life across the nation. Other decrees mandated that sessions of party organizations and legislative bodies would be conducted in Russian, and that national languages like Ukrainian, Belarusan, Lithuanian and others would be gradually removed from newspapers, radio and television.
- Brazil's Congress, with the support of President Ernesto Geisel, ended ten years of legalized human rights abuses with the enactment of Amendment No. 11 to the Brazilian Constitution. Effective January 1, 1979, the amendment revoked Institutional Act Number Five (AI-5), enacted by the military government on December 13, 1968. AI-5 had suspended the right of habeas corpus, allowing the Congress of Brazil and state legislatures to be suspended by order of the president, authorizing the federal government to remove and arrest public officials, creating a board of censors to review music, films, stage plays and TV programs before publication or broadcasting, and giving instant effect to presidential decrees.
- The first major reform of U.S. federal employment since 1939, the Civil Service Reform Act of 1978 (CSRA), was signed into law by U.S. President Carter after passing the Senate 87–1 and the House of Representatives 365–8.
- Ola Ullsten was approved as the new Prime Minister of Sweden after only 34 of the 349 members of the Riksdag voted for him. Although the vote on Ullsten was 39 in favor and 66 against, the Swedish constitution provided that a new prime minister could be elected as long as a majority of the Riksdag members— 175 – didn't vote against a candidate. Because 215 of the 320 Riksdag members who were present cast a vote of abstention, equivalent to being neither for or against Ullsten, the only candidate available, it became impossible for him to not be elected. On October 18, Ullsten formed a new 19-member cabinet that included six women.

== October 14, 1978 (Saturday) ==
- U.S. President Jimmy Carter signed a bill into law to allow homebrewing of beer in the United States.
- Daniel arap Moi, who had been the acting president of Kenya since the death of Jomo Kenyatta on August 22, was sworn into office to fill the remainder of Kenyatta's five-year term after no other candidate had sought election.
- Rescue from Gilligan's Island, a made-for-TV film on the NBC television network, became one of the highest rated shows of the week as a sequel, more than 11 years after the popular TV show Gilligan's Island had gone off the air. Almost all of the cast of the series was featured in the film as the characters were finally able to leave their "uncharted desert isle". Though panned by critics the NBC special outdrew its competition on the two other U.S. TV networks in the Nielsen ratings.
- Born:
  - Usher (stage name for Usher Raymond IV), American R&B and pop musician; in Dallas
  - Paul Hunter, English snooker champ; in Leeds (d. of stomach cancer, 2006)

== October 15, 1978 (Sunday) ==
- Voting for the new President of Brazil was conducted by a 581-member Electoral College. With 296 required for a majority, João Figueiredo of the ARENA Party (Aliança Renovadora Nacional or Alliance for Renewal of the Nation) received 355 votes, and Brazilian Army General Euler Bentes Monteiro of the MDB (Movimento Democrático Brasileiro or Brazilian Democratic Movement) got 226. Figueiredo promised that he would turn control over to a civilian president by 1985.
- A team of four women, members of a 20-woman all-female mountaineering team, reached the top of the world's 10th highest mountain, the 26,502 feet (8,078 m) Annapurna I in the Himalayas. The four became the first Americans and the first women to ever ascend the peak. Announcement of their ascent was made three days later. Two of the women on the team were killed during their descent.
- Voting began in Vatican City for a successor to the late Pope John Paul I as the 111 members of the College of Cardinals assembled in a closed session of the Sistine Chapel. With two-thirds of the voters (75) required for election, Giuseppe Siri, a conservative cardinal, received 46 votes and Giovanni Benelli was second. After four ballots, the conclave adjourned.
- Died: W. Eugene Smith, 59, American photojournalist, died of a stroke

== October 16, 1978 (Monday) ==
- Cardinal Karol Wojtyla, the Roman Catholic Archbishop of Krakow, was elected as the 264th pope on the eighth ballot. With non-Italian cardinals being considered following, Wojtyla received a few votes for the first time as balloting began, as did Johannes Willebrands of the Netherlands, who withdrew in favor of Wojtyla. On the eighth ballot, Wojtyla received 94 of the 111 votes cast. Wojtyla, honoring his predecessor Pope John Paul I, took the regnal name Pope John Paul II as 1978 became the first "Year of Three Popes" since 1605. John Paul II of Poland became the first non-Italian pope since Pope Adrian VI in 1523.
- Died: Dan Dailey, 62, American dancer, film and TV actor, winner of the Golden Globe Award in 1969, died of complications of hip surgery.

== October 17, 1978 (Tuesday) ==
- The New York Yankees won the championship of Major League Baseball in the U.S., capturing the World Series, 4 games to 2, by defeating the Los Angeles Dodgers, 7 to 2.
- The South Korean Armed Forces discovered the third North Korean tunnel under the Korean Demilitarized Zone (DMZ), and the longest up to that time. The new, incomplete tunnel was built 240 feet (73 m) below ground and stretched nearly a mile (1,635 meters or 5,364 feet) into South Korea, while the two previous tunnels (found in 1974 and 1975) were slightly more than one kilometer (3,300 feet) long. Although the existence of the tunnel had been detected four months earlier from an underground explosion, a tip from a North Korean defector alerted the South Koreans to the location.
- The Nobel Committee announced that Arno Allan Penzias and Robert W. Wilson of the United States had been jointly awarded the Nobel Prize for Physics for their 1965 discovery of the cosmic microwave background radiation left over from the "Big Bang" formation of the universe, along with Pyotr Kapitsa of the Soviet Union for his research on low-temperature phenomena. Peter D. Mitchell of the United Kingdom was awarded the Nobel Prize for Chemistry for his research in the transfer of energy in ATP synthesis.
- Jefferson Davis, who had served as President of the Confederate States of America during the U.S. Civil War, had his U.S. citizenship posthumously restored to him after 110 years as President Jimmy Carter (a native of the U.S. state of Georgia, which had been a member of the Confederacy) signed a resolution that had been passed by both houses of Congress.
- Born: Henry Osinde, Ugandan-born bowler for the Canada national cricket team with 42 One Day Internationals from 2006 to 2013, and later the interim head coach of the Canada team in 2017; in Kampala
- Died:
  - Giovanni Gronchi, 91, President of Italy from 1955 to 1962
  - Abdel-Halim Mahmoud, 68, Grand Imam of al-Azhar and the spiritual leader of Egypt's Sunni Muslims

== October 18, 1978 (Wednesday) ==
- Anatoly Karpov retained the World Chess Championship as challenger Viktor Korchnoi resigned from the 32nd game, allowing Karpov to win, 6 games to 5. Korchnoi, at one time down 2 games to 5 in a match that counted each draw as half-a-game win for both players, had rallied to tie the match, 5 games to 5.
- Thorbjörn Fälldin was succeeded as Prime Minister of Sweden by Ola Ullsten, the chairman of the liberal People's Party ("Folkpartiet"), who was able to form a new coalition government.
- Canadian jockey David A. Gall tied a world record by winning 8 races on a single day's racecard. Gall finished in first place in all but two of the 10 races at Cahokia Downs in the U.S. state of Illinois, and narrowly missed winning a ninth race by placing second in a photo finish (a reporter noted that except for that race "there would not have been any need for asterisks"). Hubert Jones had won 8 of 13 races in 1944 at Agua Caliente in Tijuana in Mexico, and Jorge Tejeira had won 8 races out of 12, although at two different race courses in the same day.

== October 19, 1978 (Thursday) ==
- The Rhodesian Special Air Service and Rhodesian Light Infantry paratroopers began Operation Gatling, an invasion of neighboring Zambia, in a campaign to eradicate guerrillas of the Zimbabwe People's Revolutionary Army (ZIPRA). As the attack began, Chris Dixon, who identified himself as "Green Leader", contacted the control tower of the Lusaka Airport and asked them to let the Zambian Air Force commander at Mumbwa that the Rhodesian forces were temporarily taking control of Zambian airspace, with an admonition that Rhodesia had no animosity toward Zambia but that the Rhodesians had orders to shoot down any Zambian Air Force planes that attempted to take off. The Zambian authorities kept all airplanes grounded until the attack on the ZIPRA camps was completed.
- Born: Lee Isaac Chung, American filmmaker and Golden Globe Award winner; in Denver
- Died: Gig Young (stage name for Byron Elsworth Barr), 64, American film and TV actor, committed suicide after murdering his wife. Young had married West German magazine editor Kim Schmidt only three weeks earlier, and the two were living in his luxury apartment at The Osborne on West 57th Street in Manhattan. At 2:30 in the afternoon, a building employee heard gunshots, and police determined that Young had shot his wife in the back of her head with a .38 caliber pistol, and then turned the gun on himself. No motive was given for the murder-suicide.

== October 20, 1978 (Friday) ==
- Eleven members of the United States Coast Guard were killed when the cutter USCGC Cuyahoga turned into the path of the Argentine coal freighter MV Santa Cruz. The Cuyahoga sank within two minutes into 58 feet (18 m) deep waters in Chesapeake Bay. Another 18 members of its crew were rescued.
- The Women's Army Corps (WAC) in the United States Army was disbanded after 36 years, as all WAC units were integrated with existing men's units.
- The first Sydney Gay and Lesbian Mardi Gras was held as a protest march and a commemoration of the Stonewall riots.
- The Police played their first US show at CBGB.
- Born: Virender Sehwag, Indian cricketer; in Najafgarh, Delhi union territory

== October 21, 1978 (Saturday) ==
- President Jaafar Numeiri of Sudan dropped his opposition to the recent peace treaty between Egypt and Israel and urged other Arab nations to do likewise. Numeiri issued a statement saying "We do not think it is our right to criticize Egypt for its efforts aiming at a peace treaty that will lead to Israeli withdrawal to its historical boundaries and to liquidation of Israeli settlements in Sinai as a part of efforts to guarantee peace and security within the framework of general principles of an overall settlement in the area.

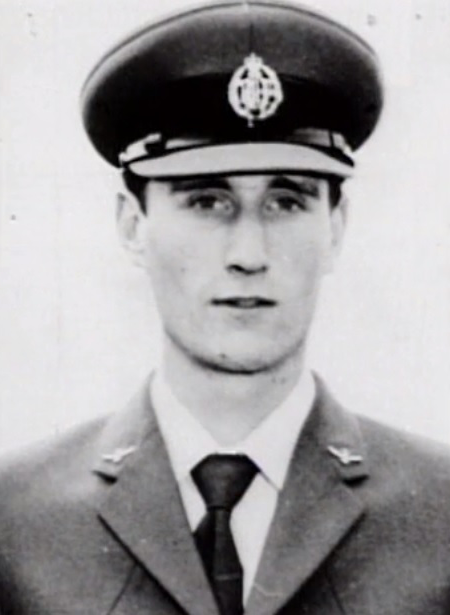
Frederick Valentich

- A 20-year-old Australian civilian pilot, Frederick Valentich, vanished in a Cessna 182 Skylane over the Bass Strait south of Melbourne after reporting contact with an unidentified aircraft. Valentich had departed from Melbourne in a Cessna 182 single-engine plane on a training flight over the Bass Strait toward a destination of King Island in the state of Tasmania and reported to the Melbourne Flight Service that an aircraft was following him at an altitude of 4,500 feet (1,400 m), though air traffic control saw nothing on radar. The UFO theory came after Valentich was answering the control tower and said his last words, "It's not an aircraft. It's...", after which an unidentified noise interrupted the transmission and all contact was lost.
- Died:
  - Anastas Mikoyan, 82, former Soviet Communist Party official who served as the Soviet Union's head of state in 1964 and 1965
  - Mel Street, 45, American country music singer, committed suicide on his birthday with a gunshot wound to the head. Gibson's death came on the same day that Mercury Records released his new single, "Just Hangin' On".

== October 22, 1978 (Sunday) ==
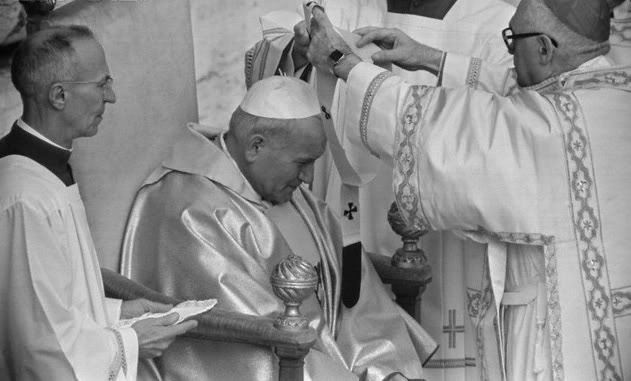
Pope John Paul II receives the pallium.

- John Paul II was formally inaugurated as the 264th Pope of the Roman Catholic Church in front of a crowd of 300,000 people from 101 nations.
- A Solomon Airlines flight with 11 people on board disappeared after departing from Bellona Island toward Honiara in the Solomon Islands. After encountering bad weather, the pilot attempted to return to the airport but was disoriented and could not locate Bellona. It ran out of fuel and ditched into the sea.
- Imi Lichtenfeld began the worldwide spread of the Israeli martial art of Krav Maga with the founding of the Israeli Krav Maga Association (IKMA). In 1995, the popularity of sport would increase to the point that he would create the International Krav Maga Federation.

== October 23, 1978 (Monday) ==
- All 26 people aboard Aeroflot Flight 6515 were killed in a domestic flight crash within the Ukrainian SSR in the Soviet Union. The Antonov An-24 had departed from Stavropol en route to Simferopol with a scheduled destination of Lvov. At 8,000 feet (2,400 m) the airplane encountered icing conditions in the clouds. The de-icing system was switched on too late and both engines flamed out. The plane plunged into the Sea of Azov 15 miles (24 km) off the coast of Yemelyanovka.
- The Treaty of Peace and Friendship between Japan and China, signed in Beijing on August 12 between Foreign Ministers Huang Hua of the People's Republic of China and Sunao Sonoda of Japan, took effect.

== October 24, 1978 (Tuesday) ==
- U.S. President Jimmy Carter signed the Airline Deregulation Act into law, ending federal controls of travel fares and routes and allowing new companies to enter the American airline market. The Act, which phased out the Civil Aeronautics Board (CAB), lowered the average price for flights and expanded the number of flights available, had passed the U.S. Senate 83 to 9 and the House of Representatives, 363–8. The first applications for an estimated 400 newly available airline routes, to be awarded on a first come, first served basis, were filed immediately after the signing of the Act at CAB headquarters, where representatives of 20 airlines had been camped outside.
- The John Carpenter film Halloween, which introduced Michael Myers to horror film fans and began a franchise that had reached 13 films in its first 45 years, was first seen by audiences, making its debut at the AMC Empire Theater in Kansas City, Missouri, before being released across the rest of the U.S. on the Friday before October 31, the day of Halloween.
- Magion, the first satellite designed and built in Czechoslovakia, was launched into orbit from the Plesetsk Cosmodrome in the Russian SFSR of the Soviet Union.
- Born: Carlos Edwards, Trinidadian footballer 92 caps; in Diego Martin

== October 25, 1978 (Wednesday) ==
- The U.S. Federal Communications Commission adopted a policy easing the requirements for American television stations to upload their programming to a communications satellite for transmission to cable television systems around the world, clearing the way for an increase in the number of "superstations". At the time, WTCG in Atlanta was the only existing station to use a satellite to transmit its signal to other cable systems. With the new FCC rules in place, two more "superstations" would be added before the end of 1978, with WGN-TV of Chicago starting on November 9 and KTVU of Oakland, California on December 16.
- For the first time since the creation of the State of Israel in 1948, Israeli Arab Muslims were allowed to begin the hajj, the annual pilgrimage to Mecca. A group of about 1,500 Muslim residents of the Jewish nation of Israel crossed the Allenby Bridge into Jordan after an interview with local radio stations.
- The Foreign Intelligence Surveillance Act (FISA) was signed into law by U.S. President Carter. The FISA act created a specific federal court to review requests by federal agencies and to issue warrants to permit surveillance of suspected spies and espionage agencies operating in the United States.
- The government of Ecuador arrested a group of 11 people, 8 of whom were American, and accused them of having contact with Ecuadorian citizens who were conspiring to assassinate presidential candidate Jaime Roldos.

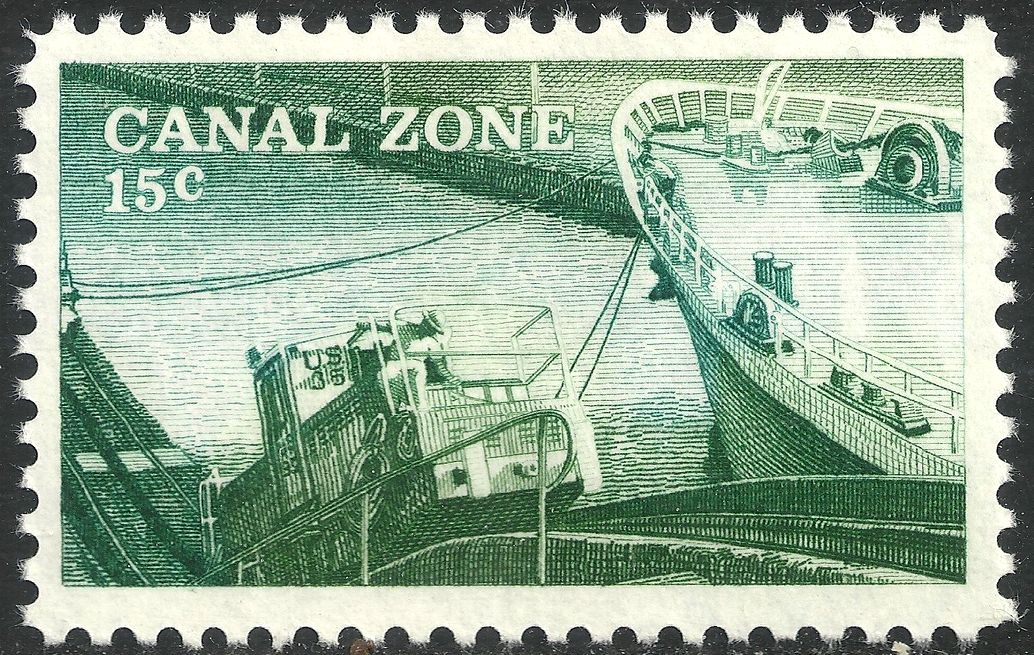
The last Canal Zone stamp

- The government of the Panama Canal Zone, a U.S. territory, issued postage stamps for the last time, releasing a 15-cent stamp for first-class postage and ending 74 years of limited self-government as a territory separate from the Republic of Panama.
- Born:
  - David T. Little, American film, opera and symphonic composer; in Blairstown, New Jersey
  - Zachary Knighton, American TV actor known for Magnum P.I. and FlashForward; in Alexandria, Virginia
  - Bandit Heeler, fictional TV character and the father in the popular animated television series Bluey. The character is voiced by Australian singer and voice actor David McCormack, who was born on October 25, 1968.

== October 26, 1978 (Thursday) ==
- The Ethics in Government Act was signed into law by U.S. President Carter, requiring mandatory disclosure of the financial records of all public officials and their immediate families, restricting outside employment for officials making more than a certain amount of money, and prohibiting lobbying work for one year after leaving public office. The Act also created the United States Office of Government Ethics to investigate complaints and to verify compliance.
- Two female orca whales, Katina and Kasatka, were captured off the coast of Iceland and shipped to SeaWorld San Diego. Katina gave birth to seven calves while in captivity, more than any other captive orca whale. Kasatka died in 2017 at age 41. As of 2024, Katina has been in captivity for 46 years.
- Born: CM Punk (ring name for Phillip Jack Brooks), American professional wrestler; in Chicago

== October 27, 1978 (Friday) ==
- Egyptian President Anwar Sadat and Israeli Prime Minister Menachem Begin were awarded the Nobel Peace Prize for their progress toward achieving a Middle East accord. U.S. President Carter, who had helped broker the agreement for the Camp David Accords, was not included by the Nobel Committee.
- The New International Version Bible, which would become the most popular contemporary English language translation of Christianity's Holy Bible, was released to the public by Zondervan in the U.S. and by Hodder & Stoughton in the UK.
- The Humphrey–Hawkins Full Employment Act, following principles of Keynesian economics and setting goals for the U.S. President to work toward in reducing unemployment and the annual inflation rates to specific percentages, was signed into law by President Carter after passing the House 257 to 152 and the Senate, 70 to 19.
- Voting was held in the African kingdom of Swaziland for a special electoral college of 80 elected members (with two candidates to choose from in each of Swaziland's Inkhundla districts), to be supplemented with another 10 to be appointed by King Sobhuza II. The 90-members electoral college then selected 40 of the 50 House of Assembly members, with the King to appoint the others.
- Born:
  - Vanessa-Mae (Vanessa Vanakorn Nicholson), Singaporean-born British violinist; in Singapore
  - Sebastian Lege, German celebrity chef and TV personality; in Bremen, West Germany

== October 28, 1978 (Saturday) ==
- In Moscow, dissidents testing the limits of the freedoms promised by the Soviet Union during the Helsinki Accords, held a press conference announcing the formation of the Free Interprofessional Association of Workers (Svobodniye Mezhprofessionaliye Obednienye Trudyashchisya or SMOT), led by Vladimir Evgenievich Borisov and Valeriya Novodvorskaya. While the conference went on as scheduled before reporters, the Soviet KGB arrested Borisova and Novolyorskaya the following month and confined both of them to mental hospitals.
- Born: Marta Etura, Spanish film and TV actress; in San Sebastián, Gipuzkoa
- Died:
  - Geoffrey Unsworth, 64, British cinematographer
  - Rukmani Devi, 55, Sri Lankan film actress and singer known as "The Nightingale of Sri Lanka", was killed in a traffic accident near Thudella while returning home from a concert in the city of Matara.

== October 29, 1978 (Sunday) ==
- Industries Minister P. K. Vasudevan Nair became the new Chief Minister of the Indian state of Kerala and its population of more than 25 million people after Chief Minister A. K. Antony resigned in protest against the re-entry of former Prime Minister Indira Gandhi into politics.
- Via Rail Canada took over all passenger train services of the Canadian National Railway.

== October 30, 1978 (Monday) ==
- A team of treasure hunters who had located the Spanish ship Nuestra Señora de Atocha, led by Mel Fisher of Treasure Salvors Inc., were finally able to collect the remainder of the cargo of gold, silver and jewels they had discovered in 1973 after a 14-year search.
- "Turkeys Away", one of the most memorable episodes of television, was shown as the seventh episode of WKRP in Cincinnati.

== October 31, 1978 (Tuesday) ==
- The Cortes Generales, parliament of the Kingdom of Spain, voted overwhelmingly to schedule a public referendum, to take place on December 6, on whether to approve or reject the new Constitution, which revoked the "Fundamental Laws of the Realm" that had been established during the Fascist rule of Generalissimo Francisco Franco. The vote in the Congress of Deputies was 325 to 6, and in the Senate of Spain it was 228 to 5/ With more than two-thirds of registered voters turning out, the new Constitution of Spain was approved by almost 92%.
- The South African Railways set a still unbeaten world rail speed record on Cape gauge.
