= November 1978 =

Month of 1978

<<	November 1978					>>
Su	Mo	Tu	We	Th	Fr	Sa
			1	2	3	4
5	6	7	8	9	10	11
12	13	14	15	16	17	18
19	20	21	22	23	24	25
26	27	28	29	30

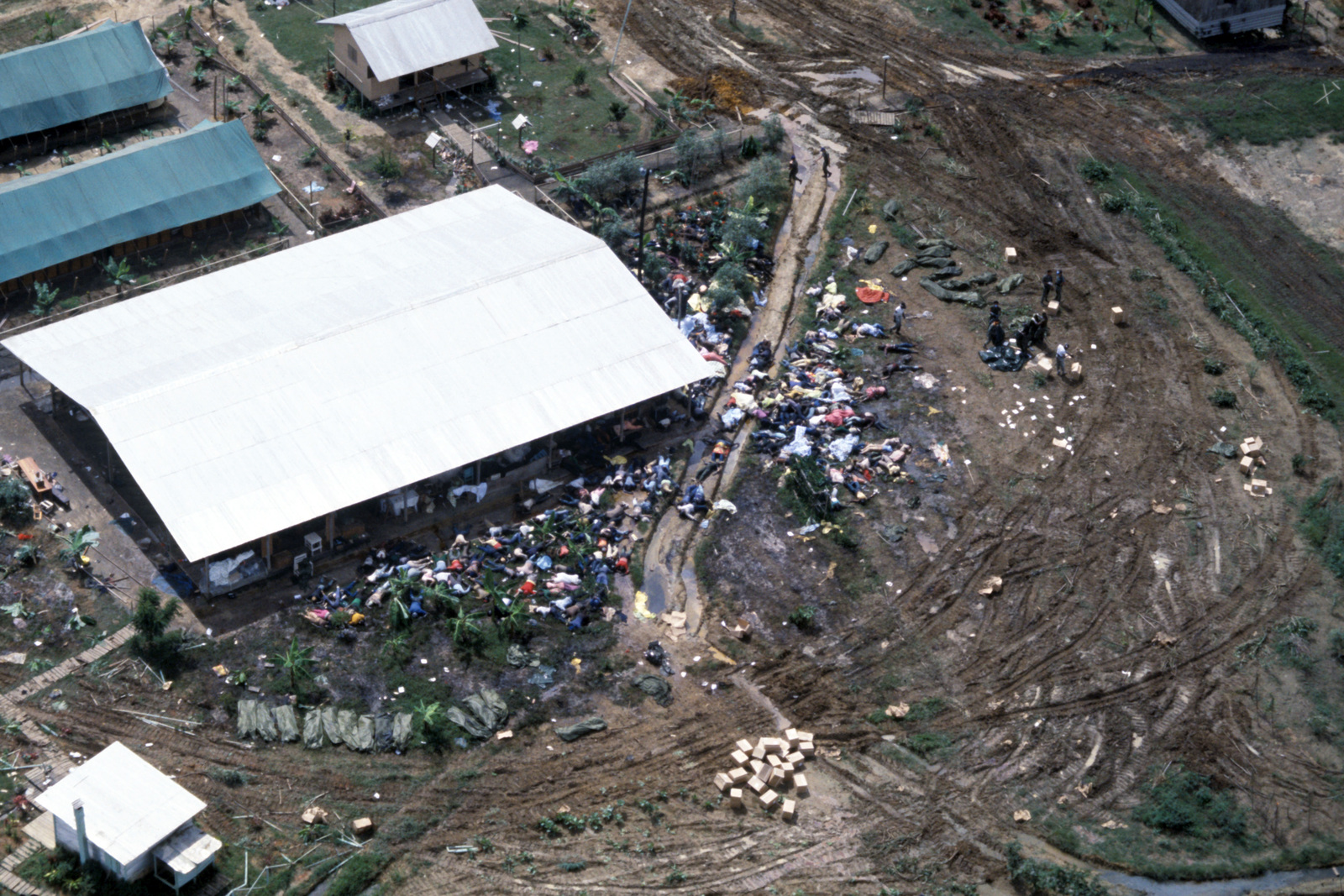
November 18, 1978: More than 900 people become victims of mass murder-suicide at compound of the Jonestown cult

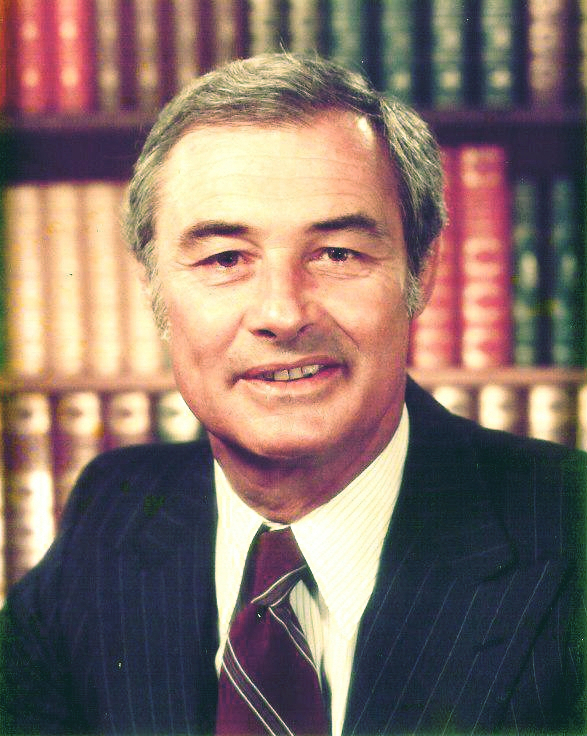
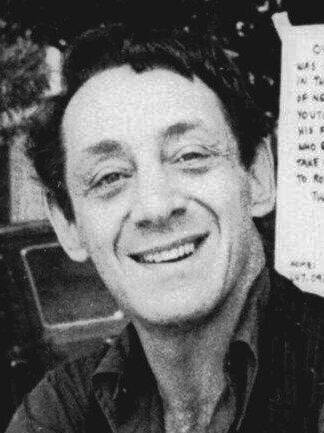
November 27, 1978: San Francisco Mayor George Moscone and Supervisor Harvey Milk assassinated by former city supervisor

The following events occurred in November 1978:

== November 1, 1978 (Wednesday) ==
- After the invasion of Tanzania by Uganda's army, Ugandan President Idi Amin issued an order annexing 710 square miles (1,800 km^{2}) of the Tanzanian territory called the Kagera Salient, located on the other side of the Kagera River that was a boundary between the two nations. In response, Tanzanian President Julius Nyerere declared a state of war and mobilized the Tanzania People's Defence Force for a full-scale conflict.
- The explosion of a natural gas pipeline killed at least 52 people in the town of Sánchez Magallanes in the Mexican state of Tabasco, most of whom were employees of PEMEX, Mexico's government-owned petroleum and natural gas company. A spokesman for Pemex said that the gas leak had been traced to a faulty coupling on one of the pipelines linking the Pemex gas fields to Mexico City.
- Canada's prime minister Pierre Trudeau and the premiers of all 10 of the nation's provinces agreed to start writing a constitution for Canada. Although the United Kingdom had granted full independence to Canada in the Statute of Westminster 1931, the UK still retained control over Canada's structure of government.
- Microsoft, the American computer company founded by Bill Gates and Paul Allen as Micro-Soft Inc., expanded overseas with the incorporation of ASCII Corporation Ltd. by Gates and Susumu Furukawa in Japan.
- The first "plain language law" in the United States went into effect in the state of New York, directing that all consumer contracts for less than $50,000 including leases, loans and credit card agreements must be written in "a clear and coherent manner, using words with common and everyday meanings", and allowing a fine of $50 per violation.
- Born: Jessica Valenti, American feminist writer and newspaper columnist; in New York City
- Died: Fred DeSarro, 41, American racecar driver and hydroplane racer, died three weeks after being injured in a car accident during a practice session at the Thompson International Speedway in Connecticut.

== November 2, 1978 (Thursday) ==
- At 8:00 pm, the Republic of Ireland's second television channel, RTÉ 2, went on the air at 8:00 in the evening with a broadcast of the opening of the Cork Opera House, with presenter Bernadette Ní Ghallchóir speaking first to the viewers. At 8:05, Ireland's President Patrick Hillery introduced the service and live music followed.
- Soviet cosmonauts Vladimir Kovalyonok and Alexander Ivanchenkov returned to Earth on their Soyuz 29 spacecraft after having spent longer in outer space than any human beings up to that time. The two men, launched toward Salyut 6 on June 15, 1978, had been away from Earth for 139 days, 14 hours and 48 minutes, more than four a half months.

== November 3, 1978 (Friday) ==
The flag of Dominica

- The Caribbean island nation of Dominica gained its independence from the United Kingdom. At the capital, Roseau, Patrick John, who had been Premier of the colony since 1974, took office as the nation's first Prime Minister but would be removed from office after less than a year. Sir Louis Cools-Lartigue, who had been the last colonial Governor, serving since 1968, took office as the first President of Dominica. After the British flag was lowered shortly after midnight, Princess Margaret, sister of Queen Elizabeth II, accepted the lowered flag and delivered a message of congratulations.
- The Soviet Union and the Democratic Republic of Vietnam agreed to a formal military alliance as Vietnam prepared to respond to incursions by neighboring Cambodia. Communist Party first secretaries Le Duan and Leonid Brezhnev of Vietnam and the Soviet Union, and Prime Ministers Pham Van Dong and Alexei Kosygin signed the pact at the Kremlin in Moscow in a televised ceremony.

== November 4, 1978 (Saturday) ==
- The Presidential Records Act, changing the ownership of a U.S. President's records to the National Archives, rather than allowing former presidents to retain their business records, was signed into law by U.S. President Jimmy Carter. The law would not take effect until January 20, 1981, and included a provision allowing a delay of up to 12 years in releasing papers about sensitive cases, in order to guarantee that aides could speak candidly with the U.S. president on controversial issues. The new law was enacted after former President Richard Nixon sought, after his resignation in 1974, to destroy his records as president.
- The Solar Photovoltaic Energy Research, Development, and Demonstration Act of 1978 was signed into law in the U.S. as the first federal law for developing solar power as an alternative to fossil fuels.
- The first public dance in the People's Republic of China in more than 12 years as the International Club in Beijing hosted almost 400 people at its reception room. In 1966, when the Cultural Revolution began, music and dancing had been banned on the grounds that the two were "morally degrading" for young people in China.
- Died: Charles D. Tandy, 60, American entrepreneur and chairman of the Tandy Corporation that owned the Radio Shack chain of electronics stores, died of a heart attack while sleeping.

== November 5, 1978 (Sunday) ==
- Voters in the European nation of Austria narrowly approved a law prohibiting the use of nuclear power. Austrian Chancellor Bruno Kreisky, who vowed to resign if voters rejected nuclear power, changed his mind the next day and stayed in office.
- Jafar Sharif-Emami announced his resignation as Prime Minister of Iran as rioting in the nation escalated into the burning of buildings in Iran, including the Information Ministry and part of the British Embassy., and was replaced the next day by Minister of War Gholam Reza Azhari.
- All 17 people on a Nile Delta Air Services flight in Egypt were killed when the Douglas DC-3 plunged into the Mediterranean Sea shortly after takeoff from the airport at Alexandria. All of the passengers were employees of the Western Desert Petroleum Company and were on their way to the Um Barka Oil Field.
- The first world championship in the sport of kickboxing were held in West Berlin in West Germany after the formation of the World Association of Kickboxing Organizations (WAKO).
- Born:
  - Bubba Watson (Garry Watson Jr.), American golfer, 2012 and 2014 Masters Tournament champion; in Bagdad, Florida
  - Yvonne van Vlerken, Netherlands triathlete and holder of the 2008 world record for best time in distance races; in Krimpen aan de Lek
  - Xavier Tondo, Spanish cyclist, winner of the 2007 Volta a Portugal (killed in freak accident 2011)

== November 6, 1978 (Monday) ==
- The People's Republic of China launched its program to eradicate illiteracy, at the time estimated to be at 25 percent, with as much as 40% for young and middle-aged people. On the proposal of the de facto leader, Vice Premier Deng Xiaoping, the State Council promulgated the "Directives on the Issues of Literacy". The decree reversed a policy that had been promoted for more than a decade during the Cultural Revolution by Zhang Chunqiao that "the whole country being illiterate is also a victory."
- The "401(k)", the most popular retirement savings plan in American history, was created by the signing into law of the Revenue Act of 1978, an amendment of the U.S. Internal Revenue Code. Three weeks later, an enterprising lawyer, Ted Benna, outlined the first plan to take advantage of the provisions of 26 U.S. Code § 401, which permitted a delay in taxation of deferred compensation saved from employee payments.
- General Gholam Reza Azhari, Chief of Staff of Iran's armed forces, became the new Prime Minister of Iran as a military government was installed by the Shah in order to stop the growing Iranian Revolution. General Azhari served for less than three months, resigning on January 2 following a heart attack, and he fled the country before the Islamic Republic of Iran was declared.
- The New York Times and New York City's most popular morning paper, the tabloid Daily News, resumed publication after having been closed because of a strike on August 10. The Daily News came back with a 192-page issue and the Times a 96-page return print, with both printing fewer copies than they had before the strike.
- Born: Jolina Magdangal, Filipino singer and actress styled the "Queen of Philippine Pop Culture"; in Quezon City
- Died: U. E. Baughman (Urbanus Edmund Baughman), 73, Chief of the United States Secret Service from 1948 to 1961, author of the memoir Secret Service Chief

== November 7, 1978 (Tuesday) ==
- Elections were held in the United States for all 435 seats of the U.S. House of Representatives and for 33 of the 100 seats in the U.S. Senate. Although the Democrats retained their majority in both houses of Congress, their Senate majority over the Republicans decreased from 61–38 to 58–41, and in the House from 292–143 to 277–157.
- Municipal elections were held in Israel for mayors and council members of cities. Teddy Kollek, mayor of Jerusalem, won a fourth term by an overwhelming vote and his Labor Party retained control of the city council.
- By order of the Shah of Iran, 60 current and former officials of the SAVAK secret police agency were arrested, including directors Nematollah Nassiri and Hassan Pakravan, as well as former prime minister Amir-Abbas Hoveyda. The group of officials remained in prison as the Iranian Revolution as the Shah fled the country and installed the Ayatollah Khomeini took power as the de facto leader, and were all tried and executed in 1979 by the new Islamic Republic.
- Two days after telling a nationwide TV audience that "I have heard the voice of your revolution," the Shah of Iran, Mohammad Reza Pahlavi, ordered the release of all political prisoners.
- Born:
  - Rio Ferdinand, English footballer with 81 caps for the England national team; in Camberwell, South London
  - Mohamed Aboutrika, Egyptian footballer with 100 caps for the Egypt national team; in Nahia, Giza
- Died: Gene Tunney, 80, American heavyweight boxer, world champion from 1926 to 1928

== November 8, 1978 (Wednesday) ==
- The Church of England's governing body, the 550-member General Synod, voted to continue the church's ban against ordination of women as priests, despite the support of the proposal from Donald Coggan, Archbishop of Canterbury.
- Donald Stewart was sworn in as the new U.S. Senator for Alabama the day after defeating James D. Martin in the general election to fill out the unexpired term of James E. Allen, who had died on June 1.
- The Indian Child Welfare Act was signed into law by U.S. President Carter, mandating exclusive jurisdiction by tribal governments, rather than county governments, over children domiciled on a reservation, and concurrent jurisdiction with the U.S. state over foster care placement proceedings for Native American children who do not live on the reservation.
- Born:
  - Ali Karimi, Iranian footballer with 127 caps for the Iran national team; in Karaj
  - Moses Michael Levi Barrow, Belizean rapper known by his stage name Shyne, and politician who has served as Leader of the Opposition in the Belize House of Representatives; in Belize City
- Died: Norman Rockwell, 84, American painter and illustrator famous for his detailed creations, often featured on the cover of The Saturday Evening Post and other magazines from 1913 to 1976

== November 9, 1978 (Thursday) ==
- The Chicago television station WGN-TV, Channel 9 on VHF television in the Illinois city, became the second TV broadcaster to use satellite transmission to reach cable systems across the United States as a "superstation" after its signal was uploaded to a transponder on the Satcom-3 communications satellite and beamed down to subscribing cable systems.
- The Labour Party government of British Prime Minister James Callaghan survived a vote of no confidence in the House of Commons with 300 members expressing no confidence in Callaghan and his cabinet of ministers, and 312 in support. If Callaghan had lost, he would have been forced to call new elections.
- Born:
  - SisQó (stage name for Mark Althavan Andrews), American R&B singer, lead vocalist for Dru Hill, later a solo artist whose song "Incomplete" reached #1 on Billboard in 2000; in Baltimore
  - Steven López, American taekwondo competitor and Olympic gold medalist in 2000 and 2004; in New York City
- Died: Miguelito Valdés, 66, Cuban singer nicknamed "Mr. Babalú", suffered a fatal heart attack while performing a concert onstage at the Salon Monserrate at the Hotel Tequendama in Bogotá in Colombia.

== November 10, 1978 (Friday) ==
- The Electronic Fund Transfer Act was signed into law by U.S. President Carter. Among other things, it limited a credit card holder's liability to $50 if the card was stolen and the bank was notified within two business days, and no more than $500 if notification was made between 3 and 59 days.
- Mommie Dearest, the first major "tell-all" celebrity biography as Christina Crawford's account of an abusive upbringing by her mother, film actress Joan Crawford, was officially released by William Morrow and Company. Even before the publication date, however, thousands of copies had already appeared in bookstores.
- Dan White, a member of the San Francisco Board of Supervisors for District 8 since January, resigned in protest over low pay and his disagreement with Mayor George Moscone and with other Supervisors. Four days later, White asked Moscone for his job back. Mayor Moscone told the press on November 21 that he would make a decision on whom to appoint supervisor on Monday, November 27 and added "Dan White doesn't have any more of an inside track than six or seven other candidates."
- The film Faces of Death, a documentary by John Alan Schwartz, known for using newsreel footage of human deaths and some dramatizations, was released in cinemas across the U.S., and would later become a popular videocassette rental.
- Born:
  - Nadine Angerer, German footballer with 146 caps for the Germany national women's team; in Lohr am Main, West Germany
  - Eve (Eve Jihan Cooper), American rapper known for the bestselling album "Let There Be Eve...Ruff Ryders' First Lady"; in Philadelphia
  - Destra Garcia, female Trinidadian soca music singer; in Laventille

== November 11, 1978 (Saturday) ==
- A meeting to prepare for a plan to overthrow the government of Spain and to restore military rule was convened by the coup leaders, Lieutenant-Colonel Antonio Tejero of Spain's Guardia Civil and Major Ricardo Sáenz de Ynestrillas of the Armed Police Corps, at the Galaxia Cafeteria in Madrid. Codenamed "Operation Galaxia", the coup d'état was set for November 17, a date chosen because King Juan Carlos would be out of the country on a visit to Mexico, and a large number of generals would be in Madrid to observe the third anniversary of the death of the late president, Generalissimo Francisco Franco. Under the plan, 200 members of the armed police would kidnap Prime Minister Adolfo Suarez, halt Spain's transition to democracy and set up a "Government of National Salvation", led by Tejero. Officers Manuel Vidal Francés, Joaquín Rodríguez Solano and José Luis Alemán of the Spanish Army infantry were present at the meeting and Vidal informed the government of the conspiracy. The coup plotters were arrested the next day.
- On the day before it was scheduled to be demolished by implosion, the 9-story Connor Hotel in Joplin, Missouri, collapsed without warning while three demolition experts were inside. Two men, Thomas Oaks and Frederick Coe, were killed. A survivor, Alfred Sommers, was buried alive in the rubble but rescued after three days.
- Died: Jack Gardner, 52, British boxer and former heavyweight champion of Europe, died of a brain tumor.

== November 12, 1978 (Sunday) ==
- Uruguayan activist Lilián Celiberti, her partner Universindo Rodríguez, and their young son and daughter were kidnapped from their home in Brazil by Uruguayan agents, and taken back to Uruguay. With the consent of the Brazilian military government as part of the Operation Condor agreement, the agents came to Celiberti's home in Porto Alegre and took her and her family out of the country. Once in Uruguay, the children were placed with Celiberti's parents and she and Rodriguez were imprisoned for the next five years. A pair of Brazilian journalists alerted the Brazilian news magazine Veja of the kidnapping. Because of the publicity, Celiberti and Rodriguez were the only two out of 200 kidnapped Uruguayan dissidents to survive, while the others "disappeared" and were not seen in public again.
- The Communist nation of Albania reported that all but one of the nation's registered voters had shown up to vote on approval of the 250 parliamentary candidates of the Fronti Demokratik i Shqipërisë. According to the government, out of 1,436,289 registered, 1,436,288 reportedly voted and 1,436,285 of the votes were valid, while 3 were rejected.
- Born: Sharmeen Obaid-Chinoy, Pakistani journalist, activist and filmmaker, winner of two Academy Awards for Best Documentary Short film and three International Emmy Awards for her documentaries; in Karachi

== November 13, 1978 (Monday) ==
- The Einstein Observatory, the first fully imaging X-ray telescope to be sent into outer space, was launched into orbit from Cape Canaveral in the United States at 12:24 in the morning local time (05:24 UTC). HEAO-2, the second High Energy Astronomy Observatory Program. Unlike HEAO 1, which conducted "sky survey" searches to locate astronomical bodies emitting x-ray radiation, the Einstein spacecraft conducted detailed observations of particular sources. Only five days after its launch, HEAO-2 returned its first major data, an image of x-rays emanating from the edge of what was believed by astronomers to be a black hole at the Cygnus X-1 star system, 6,000 light years from Earth. It would cease transmitting data after April 17, 1981 and burn up upon re-entry to Earth's atmosphere on May 26, 1982, after falling out of orbit.
- Born: Beatrice Hsu Wei-lun, Taiwanese actress and singer; in Taipei (killed in automobile accident, 2007)

== November 14, 1978 (Tuesday) ==
- U.S. Congressman Leo J. Ryan of California arrived in Guyana with a group of reporters, investigators and concerned relatives to check on reports that Americans were being held against their will at the Jonestown compound of the Peoples Temple Agricultural Project, a religious cult founded by Jim Jones. Ryan was leading a delegation from the International Relations Committee of the U.S. House of Representatives, and told reporters "I am going in response to constituent requests. I'll be talking with the Guyanese government and the U.S. Embassy. And I'd like to talk to Mr. Jones." Congressman Ryan and NBC News reporter Don Harris would not return alive after traveling to the Jonestown compound.

== November 15, 1978 (Wednesday) ==
- The crash of Loftleithir Flight 001 killed 183 of the 262 people on board, almost all of them Muslims who were returning to Indonesia after completing the Hajj pilgrimage to Mecca. The Douglas DC-8 had departed from Jeddah in Saudi Arabia and was approaching Colombo in Sri Lanka for refueling. After being cleared for landing, the crew underestimated the distance to the runway and crashed into a plantation 3 miles (4.8 km) short of the runway threshold.
- Elections were held in Brazil for all 422 seats of the Câmara dos Deputados and for 23 of the 69 seats of the Senado Federal, the last to be held under the two party system, which allowed the government-sponsored ARENA Party (Aliança Renovadora Nacional) and the opposition MDB (Movimento Democrático Brasileiro). With the increase of Chamber seats from 364 to 422 since 1974, the ruling ARENA Party won a 231 to 191 majority.
- Died: Margaret Mead, 76, American cultural anthropologist and feminist

== November 16, 1978 (Thursday) ==
- Rhodesia's 42-member biracial government, 21 white cabinet ministers and 21 black cabinet ministers for the same posts, voted to postpone elections for a black majority legislature until April 20, rescinding the March 3 internal agreement to choose a black government before the end of the year. A spokesman said that the group determined that the new constitution would not be ready until 1979. Voting to approve the constitution was set for January 30, with the white-dominated Rhodesian Parliament to be dissolved on March 8, with nominations to be made by March 23 for a new 100-member parliament with 72 black and 28 white seats.
- The annual Miss World pageant was held at Royal Albert Hall in London with contestants from 68 nations and territories. Miss Argentina, Silvana Suárez, who appeared as a replacement for the original Argentine pageant winner, Margarita Susana Heindrycks, won the competition and was crowned Miss World. Ossie Carlsson, Miss Sweden, was the 1st runner-up.
- The Society of Behavioral Medicine, was formed as a multidisciplinary organization in Chicago following the 1977 Yale Conference on Behavioral Medicine.
- The Pioneer Venus Multiprobe, which was launched by the U.S. toward the planet Venus on August 8, with four atmospheric probes, began splitting into its components, with the largest of the probes separating from the satellite bus. The remaining three smaller probes separated on November 20, and all four probes would and the bus would enter the atmosphere of Venus on December 9.
- Serial killer Charles Manson, sentenced to life imprisonment for the deaths of nine people, appeared for his first parole hearing before the California Board of Parole Hearings. Manson was transported from the Folsom State Prison California Medical Facility in Vacaville to appear before the board, which declined to grant him parole.
- Born: Santiago Peña, President of Paraguay since 2023, former Minister of Finance 2015 to 2017; in Asunción

== November 17, 1978 (Friday) ==
- The Parliament of Denmark voted to grant Greenland self-government, with elections to take place in April 1979 and home rule rights to begin May 1 with the inauguration of an autonomous government. Denmark had governed Greenland, the world's largest island 840,000 square miles (2,200,000 km^{2}) with a small population of 48,000 people, primarily of Inuit descent, for more than 250 years.
- The first body piercing shop, The Gauntlet, was opened by Jim Ward and Doug Malloy, at a storefront in West Hollywood, California.
- The Star Wars Holiday Special was shown on television for the first and only time, appearing on the CBS television network in the U.S. on the Friday before Thanksgiving Day, and on the CTV network in Canada. The videotaped program reunited Star Wars actors Mark Hamill, Harrison Ford, Carrie Fisher, Anthony Daniels, Peter Mayhew and James Earl Jones, with guest appearances by Beatrice Arthur, Art Carney, Harvey Korman, and singer Diahann Carroll and the band Jefferson Starship in hologram form.
- The kidnapping and murder of four young employees of a Burger Chef restaurant in the U.S. took place in Speedway, Indiana in what appeared at first to be the theft of $581 from a safe. The bodies of the four people— a 20-year old assistant manager, an 18-year-old woman and two 16-year-old boys— were found two days later in a wooded area. No photos had been taken inside the restaurant after the crime or before the rooms were cleaned up, destroying any evidence. The crime has never been solved.
- Born:
  - Rachel McAdams, Canadian film and stage actress known for The Notebook, Wedding Crashers, The Time Traveler's Wife; in London, Ontario in London, Ontario
  - Reggie Wayne, American football wide receiver, 2007 NFL receiving yards leader; in New Orleans
- Died:
  - Claude Dauphin, 75, French stage and film actor, died after collapsing from an internal occlusion.
  - Thomas King Forcade, 33, American journalist and marijuana rights activist who founded the magazine High Times in 1974, died one day after shooting himself in the head.

== November 18, 1978 (Saturday) ==
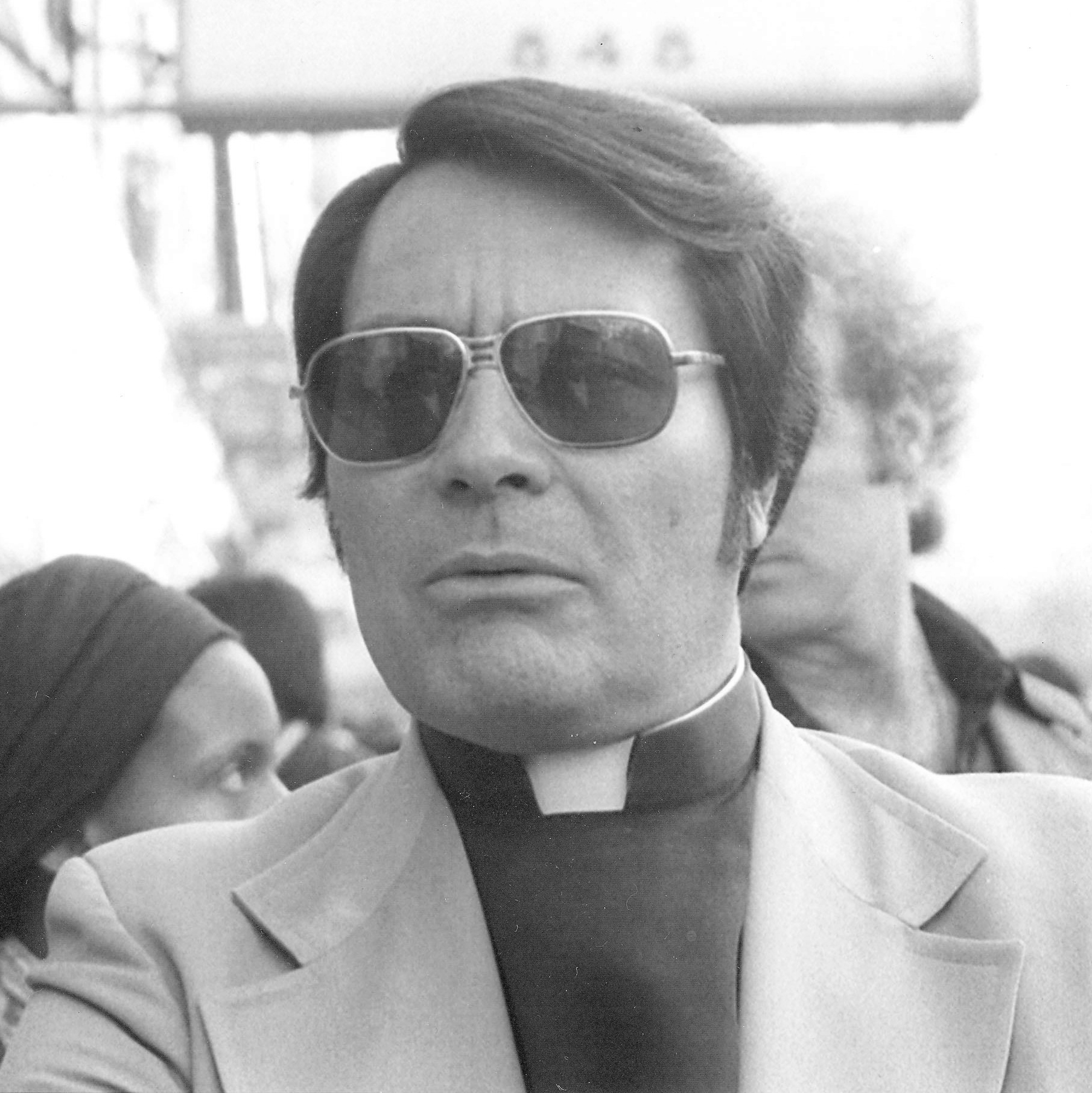
Reverend Jim Jones

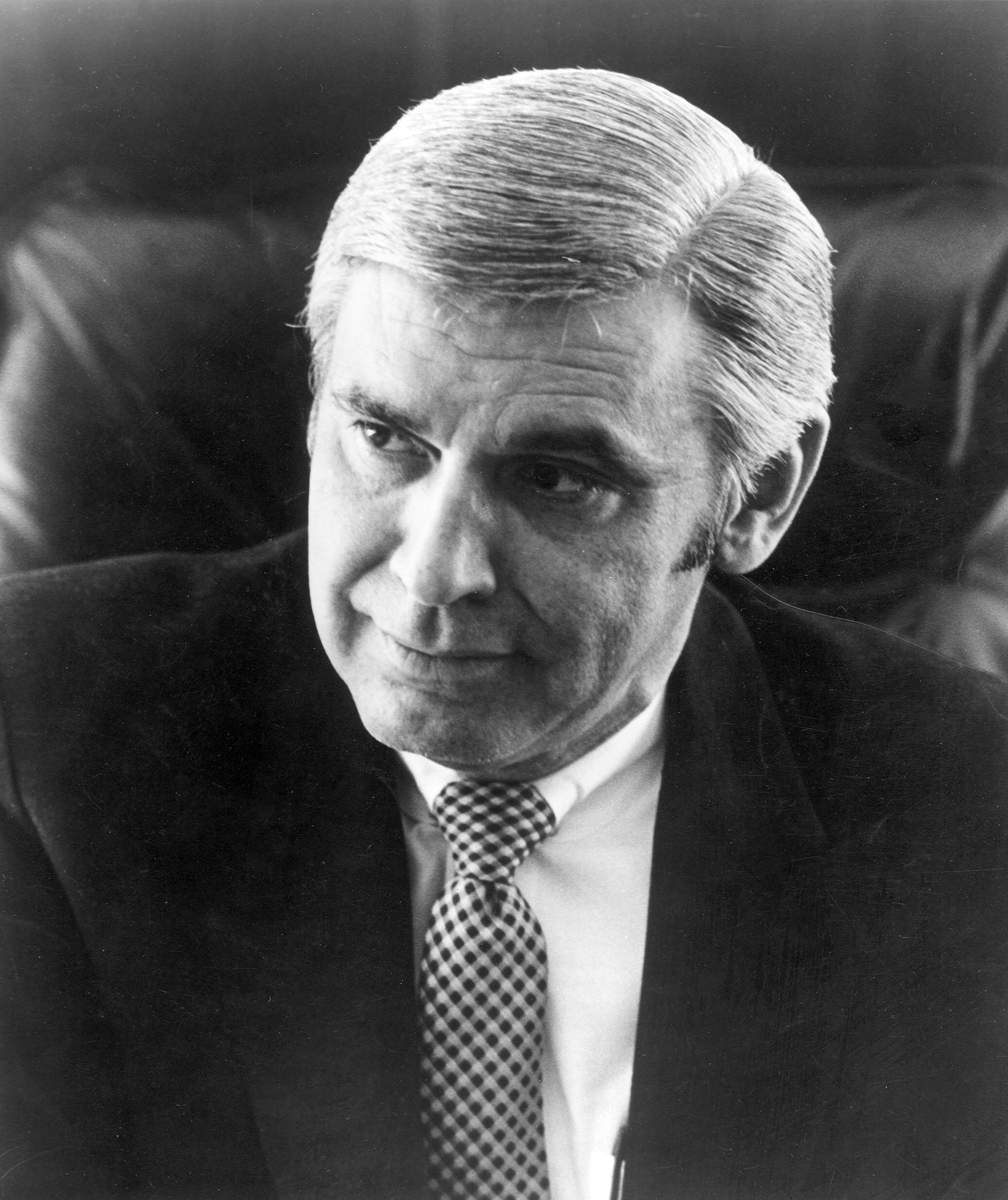
Congressman Leo Ryan

- In Guyana, Jim Jones led his Peoples Temple cult in a mass murder–suicide in his commune, Jonestown, that claimed 909 of them at Jonestown itself, including over 270 children. U.S. Representative Leo J. Ryan of California had arrived at Port Kaituma the previous afternoon, along with his assistant Jackie Speier; the Deputy Chief of Mission of the U.S. Embassy to Guyana, Richard Dwyer; and Neville Annibourne of the Guyana's Ministry of Information, and the group had spent the night. At 5:10 p.m., two airplanes arrived at Port Kaituma to take the entourage and several defectors back to Georgetown in Guyana. Ten minutes later, a group of the Peoples Temple security guards arrived and shot the group preparing to board a 19-seat Twin Otter airplane. Five group members were killed, including Congressman Ryan (who was shot 20 times), NBC News reporter Don Harris and cameraman Bob Brown, San Francisco Examiner photographer Greg Robinson and one of the Temple defectors, Patricia Parks. Another nine were wounded. Afterward, Jones gathered the Peoples Temple members and their families and urged his group to commit "revolutionary suicide". A large tub of Flavor Aid drink, laced with cyanide, was then prepared for Temple members and their families to drink while the security guards ringed the camp to keep people from leaving. Jones then shot himself. Ryan's chief advisor, Joe Holsinger, told reporters one month later that Ryan had never expected to be allowed to enter Jonestown and that "He expected to get up to the gates and be turned back. The press would be there to record everything. Then Leo planned to call for a full congressional investigation." Five years after his death, on November 18, 1983, Congressman Ryan would be awarded the Congressional Gold Medal and remains the only member of the U.S. Congress to be killed in the line of duty.
- The ocean landing of an Air Guadeloupe flight killed 15 of the 20 people aboard. The Twin Otter 300 airplane was approaching the island of Marie Galante after its departure from the Pointe-à-Pitre airport on the island of Grande-Terre, and was within two miles of landing when it struck the ocean and then sank in waters 40 feet (12 m) deep.
- Born:
  - Damien Johnson, Northern Irish footballer with 56 caps for the Northern Ireland national team
  - Aldo Montano, Italian fencer and 2004 Olympic gold medalist in the individual sabre competition; in Livorno

== November 19, 1978 (Sunday) ==
- All 77 people aboard an Indian Air Force jet were killed, along with a woman inside her home, when the Antonov An-12 struck the building while attempting to land at the Leh Airport at the end of a flight from Chandigarh.
- In a pro football game referred to by Philadelphia Eagles fans as the "Miracle at the Meadowlands", the Eagles defeated the New York Giants, 19 to 17, even though the Giants had a 17 to 12 lead and possession of the football in the final minute. Rather than letting the Giants run out the clock, the team's offensive coordinator, Bob Gibson called for a running play. Quarterback Joe Pisarcik fumbled the ball and the Eagles' Herman Edwards scooped up the ball and ran for the winning touchdown.
- Born: Mahé Drysdale, New Zealand rower, five-time world champion in the single sculls, five-time New Zealand Sportsman of the Year, Olympic gold medalist in 2012 and 2016; in Melbourne, Australia
- Died:
  - Paul I. Richards, 55, American mathematician and engineer known for developing the "Richards transformation" of converting lumped element circuits into distributed-element circuits.
  - Steven S. Gardner, 56, American banker and Vice Chairman of the Federal Reserve Board since 1976, died of cancer.

== November 20, 1978 (Monday) ==
- Whaling, the practice of hunting and killing whales, came to an end in Australia as the Cheyne Beach Whaling Company killed its final prey and then shut down. The last whale killed in Australia was a sperm whale, harpooned in Frenchman Bay near Albany, Western Australia.
- The People's Republic of China announced through its Xinhua News Agency that, effective January 1, it would be using the pinyin phonetic alphabet for all Chinese proper names and place names in place of the Wade–Giles alphabet that had been in use to make "Latin script" a representation of the Chinese language since 1892. Among the changes, initiated to improve pronunciation, was that the capital, rendered as "Peking", would be spelled as Beijing, that "Mao Tse-tung" would be spelled as Mao Zedong and that new references to Party Chairman Hua Kuo-feng and Teng Hsiao-ping would be Hua Guofeng and Deng Xiaoping. The references to the Hsinhua News Agency were changed to Xinhua. The government elected not to change the spelling of certain names with historical significance, so Hong Kong and Sun Yat-sen remained the same, rather than being spelled "Xianggang" and "Sun Chong-shan".
- Died:
  - Giorgio de Chirico, 90, Greek-born Italian painter
  - Hugh Dow, 92, British colonial administrator for whom the Dow Medical College in Pakistan is named

== November 21, 1978 (Tuesday) ==
An illustration of L_{1} relative to the Sun and the Earth

- One day after it was launched, ISEE-3, the third in the U.S. series of International Sun-Earth Explorer satellites, became the first object from Earth to be placed at a "Lagrange point" where it was equally affected by the gravity of the Earth and of the Sun. In so doing, ISEE-3 became "the first satellite to orbit a point in space rather than a body such as the Earth, Sun or Moon." Held in place at the L_{1} point, approximately 930,000 miles (1,500,000 km) ISEE-3 from Earth, confirmed that suspension between gravitational fields of two different large bodies was possible.
- All 28 people on a TAV (Taxi Aéreo El Venado) airplane in Venezuela were killed when the DC-3 crashed into Mount Judio, near Rubio, at an altitude of 11,200 feet (3,400 m). The flight had departed from Cúcuta-Camilo Daza Airport en route to Arauca-Santiago Pérez Airport.
- Died: Francesco Tricomi, 81, Italian mathematician.

== November 22, 1978 (Wednesday) ==
- The sinking of an overcrowded wooden fishing vessel drowned 254 Vietnamese refugees, including 60 women and 50 children, the day after the boat they were on was turned away from the Malaysian island of Pulau Bidong, north of Kuala Trengganu. Only 51 people survived the accident.

== November 23, 1978 (Thursday) ==
- A cyclone that killed 915 people struck Sri Lanka in the Indian Ocean, making landfall at Batticaloa, reaching peak intensity with 140-mile-per-hour (230 km/h) winds by the evening. The next day, the storm made a second landfall at India, striking Kilakkarai in the Tamil Nadu state with winds of 50 miles per hour (80 km/h).
- The Geneva Frequency Plan of 1975 (GE75) took effect, shifting AM radio band frequencies in Europe, Africa and Asia to multiples of 9, with drastic shifts on BBC stations. As a result, BBC Radio Scotland and BBC Radio Wales, formerly part of BBC Radio 4, became independent radio networks, with Scotland on 810 kHz AM and Wales on 882 kHz AM.

== November 24, 1978 (Friday) ==
- China started its experimental "household responsibility system", a departure from the communal living enforced during the Mao Zedong era, in Anhui Province.
- Bolivia's President Juan Pereda, who had been installed on July 21, was overthrown in a bloodless coup d'état and replaced by General David Padilla Arancibia. President Padilla said that he would only serve until August 6, 1979, and that free elections would be held at sometime during the first half of the year. The coup was the 184th in Bolivia's 153 years as an independent nation.
- Born: Katherine Heigl, American actress, 2007 recipient of the Primetime Emmy Award for Outstanding Supporting Actress for Grey's Anatomy; in Washington, D.C.

== November 25, 1978 (Saturday) ==
- Voting was held for the 92 seats of the unicameral Parliament of New Zealand. Although the New Zealand Labour Party (NZLP), led by former prime minister Bill Rowling, received a larger share of the popular vote than the New Zealand National Party of Prime Minister Robert Muldoon, the Nationals retained a 51 to 40 majority over the NZLP, with the Social Credit Party of Bruce Beetham winning the remaining seat.
- Born: Ringo Sheena (stage name for Yumiko Shiina), Japanese singer and musician

== November 26, 1978 (Sunday) ==
- A fire killed 10 people and injured 34 others at a Holiday Inn motel in the U.S. in Greece, New York, a suburb of Rochester. Most of the guests were spending the night on Saturday for the Thanksgiving weekend, and seven of the dead were visitors from Canada. Investigators announced that the fire was caused by arson.
- Two British commercial divers, Michael Ward and Tony Prangley, died of hypothermia in the East Shetland Basin after their diving bell plunged to the seabed at a depth of over 100 metres (330 ft).

== November 27, 1978 (Monday) ==
- San Francisco Mayor George Moscone and Supervisor Harvey Milk were assassinated by a disgruntled former Supervisor, Dan White. White had resigned on November 10, then changed his mind on November 14 and asked for his job back. On the day that Moscone had chosen to pick from several choices (including White) for the vacant seat, the mayor informed White that another person, Don Horanzy, would fill the vacancy on the Board of Supervisors. White invited Milk, who had opposed White's reappointment, to join him in talking to Mayor Moscone at the mayor's office. A few minutes after 11:00, White shot both men to death. Future U.S. Senator Dianne Feinstein, president of the Board of Supervisors, was sworn in as acting mayor and then elected by the Board of Supervisors, 6 to 2, on December 4 to finish out Moscone's term.
- At the Xidan Democracy Wall in the People's Republic of China capital, Beijing, a group of 10,000 people participated in a pro-democracy rally organized by Ren Wanding and 8 other founders of the Democracy Assembly Group, and event described by a later historian as the beginning of the Democracy Wall movement.
- Ballots were counted in Japan's first, and only, primary election to determine the two out of four candidates would become the leader of the nation's ruling Liberal Democratic Party (LDP), with the LDP President assured of becoming Prime Minister of Japan. Voting by mail was limited to people who were LDP members as of November 1, including people who had paid the membership fee in order to participate in the non-binding election that served partially as a fundraiser for the LDP. As one observer noted, "Japanese reporters discovered that some voters paid dues not only for themselves but also for their children—and even their pet dogs. Whatever names they chose to list were duly registered. No qualifications, other than paying dues, were fixed for party membership," but noted also that "Income from additional dues paid by the 1 million new members was wiped out by the cost of printing and mailing ballots." The top two finishers would then be the candidates from whom the 378 ruling committee members of the LDP would pick their leader on December 1. To the surprise of Prime Minister Takeo Fukuda, more votes went to challenger Masayoshi Ohira. Fukuda announced in the evening that he would not run as a candidate for the December voting.
- The Soviet Union's ruling Communist Party announced that it removed Kirill Mazurov from his post as one of the 15 voting members of the Politburo of the Communist Party of the Soviet Union. Mazurov was replaced by Konstantin Chernenko, who would later serve as the General Secretary, the de facto leader of the Soviet Union. At the same session of the Party's Central Committee, Mikhail Gorbachev, "a 47-year-old party functionary from the Soviet Union's agriculturally importing Sevastopol area" as a Committee Secretary; Gorbachev would succeed Chernenko in 1985 as the General Secretary.
- Born: Jimmy Rollins, American baseball player; 2007 National League MVP and 2008 World Series champion with the Philadelphia Phillies; in Oakland, California

== November 28, 1978 (Tuesday) ==
- The first "night game" in the sport of cricket was played as the new World Series Cricket competition installed floodlights at the Sydney Cricket Ground for the match between WSC Australia XI and WSC West Indies, allowing a limited overs contest that had started in the afternoon to continue after dusk. Although only 8,000 people were present at the 2:30 start, the crowd had increased to 44,374 as more fans arrived after getting off from work.
- Died: André Morell (stage name for Cecil Andre Mesritz), 69, English stage, film and TV actor

== November 29, 1978 (Wednesday) ==
- The last earthquake to be successfully forecast in advance caused major damage and killed eight people in Mexico City. The 7.8 magnitude tremor struck at 11:52 in the morning and had been expected because of irregular seismic activities in the area before the main shock. Three researchers at the University of Texas— Tosimatu Matumoto, Gary Latham and Masakazu Ohtake— had pinpointed the quake within 30 miles of its actual epicenter, publishing an article in the October 1977 issue of Pure and Applied Geophysics describing a point at 16.5° N and 96.5° W as the site of a 7.5 or greater magnitude quake that "could occur at anytime." Only one other earthquake, on August 1, 1975, in Oroville, California, had been expected because of similar activity.

== November 30, 1978 (Thursday) ==
- Punainen viiva ("The Red Line"), a Finnish language opera by Aulis Sallinen, was performed for the first time, premiering at the Alexander Theatre in Helsinki by the Finnish National Opera and Ballet.
- Born:
  - Clay Aiken, American singer-songwriter and author, winner of four Billboard Awards; in Raleigh, North Carolina
  - Gael García Bernal, Mexican actor and BAFTA Award for Best Actor winner for The Motorcycle Diaries and Golden Globe Award for Best Actor for Mozart in the Jungle; in Guadalajara
  - Robert Kirkman, American comic book writer and producer, and co-creator of The Walking Dead comic series later adapted to television; in Lexington, Kentucky
