= Contraception in Francoist Spain and the democratic transition =

Contraception in Francoist Spain (1939–1975) and the democratic transition (1975–1985) was illegal. It could not be used, sold or covered in information for dissemination. This was partly a result of Hispanic Eugenics that drew on Catholicism and opposed abortion, euthanasia and contraception while trying to create an ideologically aligned population from birth. A law enacted in 1941 saw usage, distribution and sharing of information about contraception become a criminal offense. Midwives were persecuted because of their connections to sharing contraceptive and abortion information with other women. Condoms were somewhat accessible in the Francoist period despite prohibitions against them, though they were associated with men and prostitutes. Other birth control practices were used in the 1950s, 1960s and 1970s including diaphragms, coitus interruptus, the pill, and the rhythm method. Opposition to the decriminalization of contraception became much more earnest in the mid-1960s. By 1965, over 2 million units of the pill had been sold in Spain where it had been legal under certain medical conditions since the year before. Despite the Government welcoming the drop in the number of single mothers, they noted in 1975 that this was a result of more women using birth control and seeking abortions abroad.

Franco's November 1975 death did not see an immediate effort to decriminalize contraception. Feminists had to make it a driving goal before political change would happen. This occurred in 1978, when Cortes Generales decriminalized possession, distribution and advertising of contraception as a result of the efforts of Communist and Socialist members with some support from a few UCD members. Nevertheless voluntary sterilization remained a crime in Spain and centers for family planning required women be married to use their services. It was not until 1985 and the creation of a national service that women would have for the first time state run family planning services that included contraception.

== History ==
=== Francoist period (1939 - 1975) ===
Eugenics in Spain in the late 1930s and through to the 1940s was not based on race, but instead on people's political alignment with the regime. Ricardo Campos stated: "The racial question during the Franco era is complex. Despite the similarities of the Franco regime with Italian and German fascism and the interest that the eugenics provoked, the strong Catholicism of the regime prevented its defense of the eugenic policies that were practiced in Nazi Germany." Campos went on to explain, "It was very difficult to racialize the Spanish population biologically because of the mixture that had been produced historically." Vallejo-Nágera in his 1937 work, Eugenics of the Hispanicity and Regeneration of the Race defined Hispanicness around spirituality and religion. The goal was the "strengthening psychologically" of the phenotype. Because Catholicism was opposed to negative eugenics, the only way to fight the degradation was through repression of abortion, euthanasia and contraception.

Doctors in Francoist Spain had two roles: to be moral protectors of Spanish reproduction and to provide science-based medical services. This put male doctors in charge of women's birth control. When medical doctors in the Second Republic and early Francoist period defended birth control, it was on the eugenics grounds that it protected the health of both women and children, especially as it related to the spread of genetic disease and the spread of tuberculosis and sexually transmitted diseases.

1941 saw legislation that formally made abortion and conception usage illegal with attached punishments. Sex education was also banned, with punishments attached for teaching it. Article 416 banned the sale, usage and dissemination of information about contraception. Because midwives appeared to be so frequently involved in sharing knowledge about abortion and contraceptives and performing abortions, the male-led scientific community in Spain tried to marginalize these women. Professionalization in medicine would help to relegate the importance of midwives in Spain. Further attempts to dislodge midwives from the birthing process included accusing them of witchcraft and quackery, trying to make them appear unscientific. This was all part of a medical and eugenic science driven effort to reduce the number of abortions in Spain.

Prostitution was quite common in Zaragoza in the 1940s and was tolerated by the local government. Despite this, prostitutes were often charged with the corruption of minors and with having abortions, most of whom were minors themselves. Prostitutes were the biggest population likely to be charged with engaging in birth control methods. For many married Andalusian women in the 1950s, 1960s and 1970s, there was a certain fatalism about the fact they would inevitably become mothers. It was difficult for them to try to negotiate family planning with their spouses.

Condoms were illegal during almost the whole of the Franco regime. While they were available in Spain, they were also almost impossible to come by. Some pharmacies did clandestinely sell them alongside diaphragms. Because of their connections to avoiding men spreading venereal disease, condoms were often associated with prostitution. Consequently, buying contraceptives would often be dependent on men to acquire them on behalf of their partners. Women were embarrassed to buy them. Most couples practicing family planning used coitus interruptus during the 1940s and 1950s. The Catholic Church in this period allowed couples to use the rhythm method. The Pope published a Humanae Vitae in 1968, an official statement in response to questions about contraception. Alongside condemning abortion, the Pope condemned birth control: “Similarly excluded is any action which either before, at the moment of, or after sexual intercourse, is specifically intended to prevent procreation – whether as any end or as a means [...] always unlawful the use of means which directly prevent contraception”. As American culture began to influence Spain more during the mid-1950s, Spaniards began to adopt more American birth control methods. By 1965, even most Spanish Catholics thought birth control was a reasonable option to control the number of children. 51.5% of Spanish Catholics believed that the rhythm method was ineffective. Even Spanish doctors agreed that birth control was important in family planning, although 24% of them were generally opposed to birth control.

Prohibitions against the sale of contraception in Andalusia in the 1950s, 1960s and 1970s were largely ineffective as women had various means to try to limit the number of children. This was especially true for women engaging in sex outside of marriage at a time when that practice, along with having children when single, were highly condemned by the government. Women were willing to take risks to have sex for pleasure by using some form of birth control. In 1966, the first man was convicted in Spain for selling contraceptives. He was also charged with causing a public scandal.

Despite contraception being illegal, by the mid-1960s, Spanish women had access to the contraceptive pill. It was first sold on the commercial market in the country in 1964, where Anovial 21 de Productos Quimicos Schering was also heavily advertised. Women could be prescribed the pill by their doctors if they were married and could make a case that they had a gynecological problem which the pill could fix, but this reason could not be a desire to avoid being pregnant. Its usage was largely only allowed for the regulation of a woman's period. Many married women found it difficult to get prescriptions from their doctors, having only more marginal luck when they sought out private practitioners. Consequently, most of the women who were on the pill were married upper-middle class women. Some women were given the pill to control menstrual issues, but were not told of its contraceptive properties. In 1970, 2 million units of the pill were sold in Spain. By 1975, official estimates suggested half a million Spanish women were on the pill. The media, both general and specialized, covered the pill, where it was known as an anovulatory treatment. Its introduction in Spain allowed women's sexuality to be discussed for the first time, especially in medical and religious publications and more generally in women's publications. Despite this, the most popular method in the 1960s was coitus interruptus.

Contraceptive legalization began to be an issue for Spanish feminists in the mid-1960s. This was part of their broader interest in women's reproductive rights. Among the feminists involved in this period was Santiago Dexeus Trias de Bes, an assistant doctor of the Maternitat de Barcelona who had an interest in family planning. Elvira Ramos García was also among the group. The pediatrics specialist was a member of the Communist Party of Spain and promoter of the Democratic Movement of Women in Murcia. In 1969, she attended a course organized by Planned Parenthood on contraceptive usage.

The Catholic Church made their opposition to birth control known again in 1968, with Pope Paul VI publishing an article affirming the Catholic Church's opposition to artificial birth control methods like the pill. In contrast, in 1974, 51% of the doctors said in a survey that they considered the existence of free birth control consultations to be something they would like to see offered by the Government. A previous survey carried out in 1965 revealed that 93.5% of women interviewed believed that there were reasonable motives for birth control in exceptional cases, and 60.5% maintained this belief for the majority of cases.

Ahead of the Year of the Woman, the Government created eight commissions to investigate the status of Spanish women. The Government used submissions from these commissions to produce two reports that were published in 1975. They were La situación de la mujer en España and Memoria del Año Internacional de la Mujer. In their reports, single motherhood was identified as a problem, though they noted it was in decline which they attributed in part to the use of the pill and other contraceptives, and to women having abortions in other countries where the practice was legal.

1974 percentages of women by education level and birth control method based on Fundación FOESSA survey
| Birth control method known | Without any education | Primary education | Middle education | Technical and professional education | Higher education | All levels of education |
|---|---|---|---|---|---|---|
| None | 24 | 14 | 6 | 8 | 8 | 12 |
| Coitus interruptus | 19 | 22 | 57 | 44 | 66 | 31 |
| Rhythm method and derivatives | 13 | 30 | 72 | 60 | 83 | 41 |
| Condoms | 36 | 44 | 71 | 71 | 82 | 51 |
| The pill | 37 | 60 | 79 | 76 | 80 | 64 |
| No answer | 27 | 18 | 9 | 6 | 4 | 16 |

=== Democratic transition period (1975 - 1982) ===
At the time of Franco's death in November 1975, almost all the laws related to female sexuality were still intact, including prohibitions on the use of contraceptives. During the mid-1970s, the Catholic Church preached that no physical barrier should be present during sex, and that even post-coital washes were problematic as they interfered with the primary goal of sex being conception. The Catholic Church taught the only acceptable reproductive control methods were abstinence and the rhythm method.

The first organization created about women's reproductive health and birth control was opened in Madrid in 1976 by Federico Rubio. Asociación de Mujeres de Aluche was one of the earlier women's reproductive health and birth control centers, creating in the first years after the end of the dictatorship. While the pill was still illegal in 1977, 8 million were sold in Spain. A year later, sales exceeded 10 million units. Adolfo Suarez said of legalization of contraception in 1977 "We must provide legal coverage and transparency to what is normal and usual at the street level."

In 1977, Juan Luis Cebrián was charged with disclosing information about contraceptive use in an article he wrote in the newspaper Sunday Times as part of a series by British doctors. He was facing the possibility of a 200,000 pesetas (GBP£1,670) fine and six months in prison. In the article, he mentioned that contraceptive use was widespread in Spain, with one million women using some form on a regular basis. Some forms were sold publicly, in pharmacies with government approval.

1978 was the year that contraception became a driving issue among Spanish feminists. Their goal going into the year was to see contraception decriminalized by year end. The Suarez government sent the Cortes Generales a bill to decriminalize contraceptives on 15 December 1977. By April 1978, the issue of decriminalizing contraception was being debated in the Spanish Cortes, a new national legislative body with only 21 women. Communist María Dolores Calvet pointed out during the debate that contraception legalization was one of the issues agreed upon as part of the Moncloa Pacts. This discussion took place around the same time as the decriminalization of abortion, with division along ideological lines. UCD could agree with PSOE to pass legislation to avoid procreation but not over the issue of terminating a pregnancy. UCD got support from the right to ban the sale of contraceptives that were "harmful to the health". PSOE rallied the left, managing to prevent by a single vote, the ability for the Government to make decrees that would limit contraceptive advertising. This was largely a result of abstentions from UCD. Socialist Vicente Sotillo pointed out in the debate that UCD's efforts to decriminalize contraceptives while at the same time criminalizing the sale of contraceptives harmful to health was incoherent. Catalan Communist José Solé Barberá compared the Government's lack of willingness to fully decriminalize contraceptives as akin to the policies of Hitler, Stalin and Franco. Communists and socialists were successful in seeing their measures come into law. By a vote of 140 to 141, issuance of contraceptives was legalized but there were limits on the ability to advertise them.

The Cortes Generales formally decriminalized the sale and use of contraceptives, as well as allowing disclosure of information about their use on 7 October 1978. It became the first time in the history of Spain that a woman's sexuality was separated from procreation. The law gave women control over the number of children they wanted to have, when they wanted to have children, and if they wanted to have children while single or married. This would later prove pivotal in a Spanish context as it came to other rights for women that had previously centered around procreation and sexuality.

Despite the legalization of contraception in 1978, voluntary sterilization remained a crime in Spain, with doctors punishable by prison terms for performing such procedures. At the same time that contraception was decriminalized, the Government announced it would create 74 centers for the orientation of families to attend to married couples. Spanish gynecologists were upset about the word orientation, seeing it as paternalistic and inappropriate. Many also refused to ask women using these clinics for their family books that showed proof of marriage. A national health service was created in 1985, providing women for the first time with state-run family planning services that included contraception.
