= Women in Partido Comunista de España in Francoist Spain =

Women in Partido Comunista de España in Francoist Spain faced many challenges. Partido Comunista de España (PCE) had been made illegal by the new regime, which banned all political parties and trade unions. In the final days of the Civil War and during the first days of Francoist Spain, women were imprisoned just for being related to "reds". They were also investigated, harassed, imprisoned and executed for expressing sympathy for Republicans or belonging to any leftist organization. Many women in PCE were caught up in this. PCE women's organization Agrupación de Mujeres Antifascistas survived the war, and shifted their priorities to assisting political prisoners in Francost jails.

PCE itself emerged as the dominant clandestine political organization in Spain. Women would find getting involved difficult as the Communist party became very patriarchial, with women being locked out of leadership positions, locked out of guerilla organizations, not allowed to attend political training, and told that any Communist activism they did could not interfere with their role as housewife. More militant involvement was viewed as morally unacceptable.

The situation for women only began to change in PCE during the 1960s, with more women's Communist groups being created. Women faced new challenges, including pressure to have sex with male membership to prove they were liberated. Barcelona founded Movimiento Democrático de Mujeres became the dominant Communist women's organization in this period, holding on to this position up until the death of Franco in 1975.

PCE was legalized in 1977. This change brought in a generational shift. While PCE announced itself as "the party of the liberation of women", it did little to follow up on this. They were abandoned by many feminists and women more generally. They began to fade into political obscurity by the 1982 Spanish general elections.

== Political context ==
Francoist Spain was a pseudo-fascist state whose ideology rejected what it considered the inorganic democracy of the Second Republic. It was an embrace of organic democracy, defined as a reassertion of traditional Spanish Roman Catholic values that served as a counterpoint to the Communism of the Soviet Union during the same period. It came into exist in 1939 following the end of the Spanish Civil War. Misogyny and heteronormativity where linchpins of fascism in Spain, where the philosophy revolved around patria and fixed gender roles that praised the role of strong male leadership.

In July 1936, the Spanish Civil War started with a military coup attempt launched from the Spanish enclave of Melilla. In October of that same year, Franco took over as the Generalissimo and Chief of State in Nationalist zones. On 19 April 1937, Catholic and Falangist parties were merged, making Falange Española Tradicionalista the official state party behind Nationalist lines. On 30 January 1938, the first National State Cabinet meeting was held, with the Spanish Civil War formally coming to an end on 1 April 1939 and an official government formalized on 8 August 1939.

The Franco regime banned all political parties and trade unions. The only permissible type organization was Falange, founded by José Antonio Primo de Rivera in 1933. An election was held in 1966, where people were given the option to affirm or deny Franco's leadership. With more voters than electors, Franco was affirmed as Head of State. Prince Juan Carlos was appointed as Franco's official successor in 1970, with Admiral Luis Carrero Blanco being the unofficial successor. Carrero Blanco was assassinated in 1973 by ETA. Franco died in November 1975.

== History ==
=== 1937 - 1955 (economic crisis) ===
In the first days of the Francoist period, it was a crime for a mother, daughter, sister or wife of a "red", and this could be punished with long prison sentences or death. In the Basque Country, following the Nationalist seizing control of the area, women found themselves being investigated by the new regime. In Biscay, over 300 different women were investigated in this period. Many were also imprisoned. They were subject to scrutiny because people accused them of being involved with or having sympathies for groups like Partido Comunista de España, Unión General de Trabajadores (UGT), Partido Socialista Obrero Español (PSOE), Partido Nacionalista Vasco (PNV), and Emakume Abertzaleen Batzak.

The PCE aligned Agrupación de Mujeres Antifascistas survived the war, managing to organize on the local level in the interior though their numbers and capabilities were very much depleted. Most of their activities were devoted to supporting PCE affiliated political prisoners in Francoist jails. This contrasted with the CNT aligned women's group, Mujeres Libres, whose leaders generally fled abroad to exile with the notable exception of Lucía Sánchez Saomil who went into internal exile. Mujeres Libres disappeared from the scene during the early Francoist period.

Partido Comunista de España became the dominant clandestine political organization in Spain following the end of the Civil War. It would retain this position until the death of Franco saw PSOE replace it. During their rebuilding process after the war, many people, including guerrilla fighters, were caught by the regime and executed. Rosa Estruch Espinós, Asunción Pérez Pérez, Amalia Estela Alama, Adelaida de la Cruz Ramón Tormo, Ángela Sempere and Remedios Montero were some of the communist women imprisoned during the Franco regime as a result of her involvement with the party during the Civil War. Women were involved with the party, helping to organize covert armed resistance by serving in leadership roles and assisting in linking up political leaders in exile with those active on the ground in Spain. During the later parts of the war and at its conclusion, some women from POUM were coerced into making false confessions in Moscow courtrooms, and then sent to Soviet prisons. Their major crime was being Trotskyites.

Women in PCE were not valued. They were not recognized. They were not given political training. They did not have access to male PCE leadership. They were not allowed to attend cadre schools. They had almost no rights inside the party. Some of these women were upset by this as they believed in the cause. Women were generally not part of the founding of guerrilla groups operating in the 1940s. They were brought in later, as part of a disaffected class, through personal and political contacts. Almost all women involved with guerrilla groups were from rural areas and had family involved. This differed from the previous period, where many fighters came from the middle class and urban areas.

During the Spanish Civil War, PCE adapted the slogan, "Men to front, women to the rearguard." (Spanish: “los hombres al frente, las mujeres a la retaguardia”). This gender divided thinking continued in the Francoist period as PCE rebuilt. Women were to be organized separately from male guerrilla groups, both in the interior and the exterior. With this thinking, Unión de Mujeres Españolas was created by the PCE, and renamed Unión de Mujeres Antifascistas Españolas (UMAE) in 1947. Republican mothers abroad addressed the problem of specifically being targeted by Franco's regime by in their own way. Spanish Communist women in exile suggested mothers in this period should fade into the background, serving in roles that supported single women and men who could be more visible in the struggle against Franco. Communists emphasized a traditional view of motherhood espoused by Franco.

UMAE attracted large numbers of Spanish exiles in France in the immediate post-war period. It faced more challenges recruiting members in the interior. The group published a magazine in France called “Noticias del interior”, which discussed the activities of UMAE women working in the interior and manifestos written by these militants.

While for men, the PCE resistance efforts were called “Operación Reconquista de España”, for women the call was different "Help our heroic guerrillas!" (Spanish: “¡Ayudad a nuestros heroicos guerrilleros!”) This differentiation in gender roles imposed by PCE was made explicit in their writings, including in a 1944 edition of PCE magazine "Reconquista de España" which said, "Six years have passed and [...] every day we see closer that long-awaited moment to return, but we must not expect that it is only our guerrillas who liberate it. As women we have to help them achieve liberty, we do not want them to one day have the ability to boast of being the only ones who have freed our Mother; we have to work more and more every day to contribute to the Reconquest of Spain. We must make ourselves worthy of calling ourselves Spanish, worthy of our guerrillas. They have their place in Guerrillas, we in the Feminine Sections of National Union."

Dolores Ibarrurí was the president of UMAE. As its leader, she defined the organization, the role of women in PCE, what women should be doing in the interior and in exile, and how PCE involved women could resolve their militancy with their ability to be a good housewife and mother. She explained how to do this in one PCE magazine, saying, "I have had six children and a miserable salary, and my political training has not been easy, I have done the most humble tasks: from cleaning the Casa del Pueblo to selling the newspaper, making the arrangement of my house and my children compatible With the attendance at the meetings and the collaboration in the workers' newspapers, how did I find time for it? Early in the morning and [...] without pretending that you all do the same, I am convinced that with a little interest in your part, you will always find the necessary time to dedicate it to the organization."

In Galicia and León, women took to the mountain to participate in clandestine resistance against the regime with PCE affiliated guerrilla groups in the early 1940s. Their continued presence was a result of PCE having less control over its groups in these areas. Adoración Campo Cañedo was the first woman from this region to head for the bush, joining guerrillas in 1940. She was followed by Alida González, sisters Antonia y Consuelo Rodríguez Montes, Alberta Viñales Martínez, Alpidia Moral Alonso and Asunción Macías Fernández. Alpidia Moral Alonso and Asunción Macías Fernández both died in the bush as a result of their combat activities.

In 1942, Spanish Republican groups in exile met in Mexico, forming the Unión Democrática Española (UDE). Participants included PSOE, UGT, Izquierda Republicana (IR), Unión Republicana (UR), Partido Republicano Federal (PRF), Unió de Rabassaires and Aliança Nacional de Catalunya (ANC). Partido Comunista Española (PCE) was excluded as communists were out of favor following the end of the Spanish Civil War. The goal of the meeting was to establish an alternative Juan Negrín led government abroad in opposition to Franco. PCE had similar goals but by December 1942, their writings excluded all possibility of joining with other Republican forces.

Neus Catalá and Irene Falcón were both involved in PCE in the exterior in the 1940s. In Paris in the mid-1940s, UMAE took pains to make clear that women could be involved with the organization while keeping up with all their domestic work. PCE did not want to scare away more traditional women by making the organization to focused on male militant activities. Further, they also wanted to broaden their support base to include traditionalists and Catholic women who firmly supported traditional Spanish gender roles. Activities for women included supporting prisoners, fund-raising, protecting children, acquiring clothing for distribution to other exiles in need and providing snacks for PCE party events.

PSOE, Unión General de Trabajadores (UGT), Partido Comunista Español (PCE), Confederación Nacional del trabajo (CNT), Juventudes Socialistas de España (JSE), Movimiento Libertario Español (MLE) and the Moviment Socialista de Catalunya (MSC) continued their struggle in exile. From 1944 to 1960, the French city of Toulouse served as a major publishing hub for many of these organization's home in exile. The city of Toulouse itself would see around 40,000 exiles from these groups settle permanently in the city.

The punishment of being a female relative of a "red" male was resurrected between 1945 and 1947, when there was a surge in guerrilla activity. This resulted in a large number of rural women swelling the ranks of Spanish prisons, including in women's prisons in Madrid, Córdoba, Málaga and Segovia. They had received sentences of 20 to 30 years merely for feeding "red" male relatives.

In 1946, women political prisoners in Madrid's Las Ventas prison held a hunger strike to protest the poor quality of food they were provided. Women from socialist, communist and anarchist organizations came together behind bars to coordinate the strike. While they were successful in seeing food quality improved, prison officials subsequently reorganized the prison population to prevent further political collaboration within the confines of the prison.

Asunción Cubero Royo was arrested in 1947. Authorities suspected her of planning an attack on the main railway line Barracas and Rubielos de Mora in Aragón, and of serving as a liaison to Guerrilleros de Levante. Guerrilleros de Levante were aligned with PCE, and were their most important group in Aragón in the 1940s. The militant son of Asunción Cubero Royo described their work as, "By 1946, Consejos de Resistencia was strong, women played a fundamental role, incorporated into the struggle through the Consejos de Resistencia, developing mail routes between cities and towns; they are part of the reliable information service. Among other things they work weaving wool, making gloves, jerseys, scarves for the prisoners and guerrillas. [...] The Consejo de Resistencia de la Estación de Rubielos has many links to Albentosa and Los Mases, to which Asunción Cubero Royo belonged (detained at the end of 1947), maintaining the link between the Communist Party and Valencia and the guerrillas. Like others, they work tirelessly knitting for prisoners and guerrillas."

While anarchists were more willing to accept women escaping Guardia Civil harassment by joining guerrillas, PCE was not as they believed that women being involved with these groups was not morally acceptable. After December 1949, there is no evidence that women were allowed in an Agrupación Guerrillera de Levante y Aragón. Women were placed for away from guerrillas in safe houses holding multiple families. Esperanza Martínez and Remedios Montero were the only two women allowed to live in the mountains among guerrillas in Aragon after December 1949, but they held lower status, were not allowed to stand guard and were frequently moved to protected areas. At the same time, they were not given feminine tasks, such as being required to cook and clean.

Carmen Jerez, the girlfriend of Abelardo Macías, was arrested by Brigadilla de Servicios Especiales in Fervenza in July 1946. Her crime was being the girlfriend of a guerrilla. She was tortured for nine months by the Brigadilla. When her body was dump, she was in an advanced stage of pregnancy and showed evidence of the abuse she had endured.

=== 1955 - 1975 (economic opening) ===
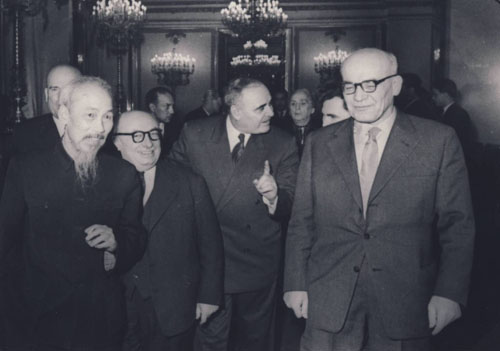
Chivu, Ho Si Min, M. Rakosi, Dej, Dolores Ibaruri in Moscow in 1955.

From 1957 to 1962, the Franco regime faced labor strikes in Asturias, with the biggest in Pozo María Luisa. Sindicato de los Obreros Mineros de Asturias (SOMA) had its greatest strength in this region, with socialist and communist women leading the organization of strikes on 23 March 1957. They organized in two locations, including the esplanade of Pozo María Luisa and at the highway connecting Oviedo with Campo de Caso. Their actions would serve as a blueprint for future strikes at the Nalón and Caudal mining basins.

In 1958, Josefina Arrillaga and José Federico de Carvajal created a Spain based a UGT Lawyers' Office, which allowed the organization to provide legal services to many people including Antonio Alonso Baño, Luis Castillo Almena, Carlos Zayas and María Luisa Suárez Roldán. In 1963, Spanish communist Julian Grumau was condemned to death by the Franco regime for his alleged crimes during the Spanish Civil War.

The leadership of Santiago José Carrillo Solares in PCE would result in the party renouncing the use of violence in the mid-1960s. This led to a split in the party, with Partido Comunista - Marxista Leninista (PC - ml) being formed and later the founding of FRAP (Revolutionary Antifascist Popular Front).

Starting in the 1960s, women's groups and feminists organizations began to emerge. Women's associations were tolerated by the regime but were not completely legal. This changed when in 1964, women's associations were legally allowed. Feminists associations were legally allowed starting in 1978, a year before PCE began a legal political party.

Women in PCE were pressured to have sex in the mid-1960s and 1970s to prove that they were free. There was an element of lack of choice if they wanted to prove their leftist credentials. According to Merche Comalleba, "The PCE militants told us that we were some sluts, some whores, that our goals were neither feminist nor political nor anything". PCE student activist Paco Fernández Buey said of the mid-1960s, "It was natural for an imprisoned male communist's girlfriend to be virtuous and faithful to force, even if her partner was not going to get out of jail in decades."

Movimiento Democrático de Mujeres (MDM) was created in 1965 in Barcelona by communist and Catalan socialist women. The organization quickly found covert support among other women in northern Spain as they tried to accomplish socio-political goals. Because of their overt feminist ideologies, some supporters worried MDM's "doble militancia" would diminish their effectiveness as they sought to work towards concrete political goals. The organization drew from two different eras of Spanish feminists. The first was a community of older women who had suffered the most under the change from the Second Republic to Francoist Spain. The second group was known as the "pro preso" generation who came of age through clandestine neighborhood led activism. This meant the organization's feminist goals were sometimes in conflict and not well defined as members had to navigate ideological differences in what being a feminist meant. MDM had always been strongly susceptible to party politics of both the Communists and Socialists. In 1969, these ideological differences would lead to the organization splitting in Catalonia. Because PCE was more organized in Madrid, MDM continued there and in other PCE strongholds. This strengthened PCE's ability to guide the organization using communist ideology.

Carmen Muriana worked for ODAG and then Standard Eléctrica y Plata Meneses during the 1970s. Her work put her into contact with a number of clandestine organizations including Liga Comunista Revolucionaria, CCOO and PCE. With them, she participated in strike actions and demonstrations. She also distributed union propaganda.

In 1974, MDM changed their name to Movimeinto para la Liberación de la Mujer (MDM-MLM) and became more explicitly feminist in their political activism. In this new period of activity, they were attacked by many leftist organizations who believed they were too bourgeois and that a focus on feminist goals was a distraction from the broader class based struggle in Spain. At the same time, MDM-MLM also challenged traditional patriarchal left wing views on women. They were also attacked by the right for being communists, anti-woman and anti-regime. The group faced internal divisions on whether they needed male activists to achieve women's political goals, or whether they should remain sex segregated so as to challenge patriarchal beliefs. Movimiento Democrático de Mujeres's main issues reflected those of PCE, including lowering food prices, improved pedestrian safety by creating more crosswalks, and showing solidarity with political prisoners. PCE believed these were the only issues for which housewives could be mobilized.

PSUC, the Catalan Communist Party, had many feminists involved in 1975, the year Franco died. They were pushing both PSUC and PCE to adopt more feminists politics. PCE student activist Paco Fernández Buey said, "Many of them, considering that communism was a revolutionary ideology, pushed the PCE to recognize the need to extend universal civil liberties to women. " Trade unions were officially not allowed in Francoist Spain with the nominal exception of the Falange led union organization Organización Sindical Española (OSE). Women tended not to be involved with them. When they did though, Falangist women would often find themselves working alongside socialist and communist women and would serve as a focused source of opposition to the regime.

=== 1975 - 1982 (democratic transition) ===
To avoid bloodshed following the death of Franco on 20 November 2975, left leaning parties like PSOE and PCE agreed to the "pact of silence" which largely involved not discussing or seeking to prosecute atrocities committed by the Franco regime during its time in power, or by either side during the Spanish Civil War.

==== Spanish general elections of 1977 ====
PCE was legalized on 9 April 1977. Its legalization was viewed at the time as an important required step in Spain's democratic transition. The decision by Adolfo Suarez to legalize the party was sped up as a result of PCE's actions following the 24 January 1977 murders of seven labor lawyers in Atocha.

While PCE had positioned itself to be a leading left-wing organization in the transition period, generational differences and ideological differences of the role of women would speed up its political irrelevancy by 1981. Failure to address women's issues played a key role in they party's electoral losses in the 1982 Spanish general elections.

Ahead of the 15 June 1977 general elections, PCE announced it was "the party of the liberation of women". At the same time, political and social conditions largely remained unchanged. Leftist parties did not necessarily accept demands of most feminists accept for certain issues like the legalization of conception. Many feminists involved in political groups abandoned specific goals in favor of broader political goals, resulting in a diluted form of feminism being adapted by major leftist parties.

The Primeras Jornadas de la Mujer were held in the Basque Country from 8–11 December 1978. The Primeras Jornadas de la Mujer were held in Granada in 1979. At both, the issue of dual militancy was discussed by women trade unionists and political party members in attendance. For many of these women, even though they were able to work, their husbands often demanded they do traditional women's housework and childcare because the husband said his unionist and political activities were more important than hers. This left many women feeling insecure in their activism.

==== Spanish Constitution of 1978 ====
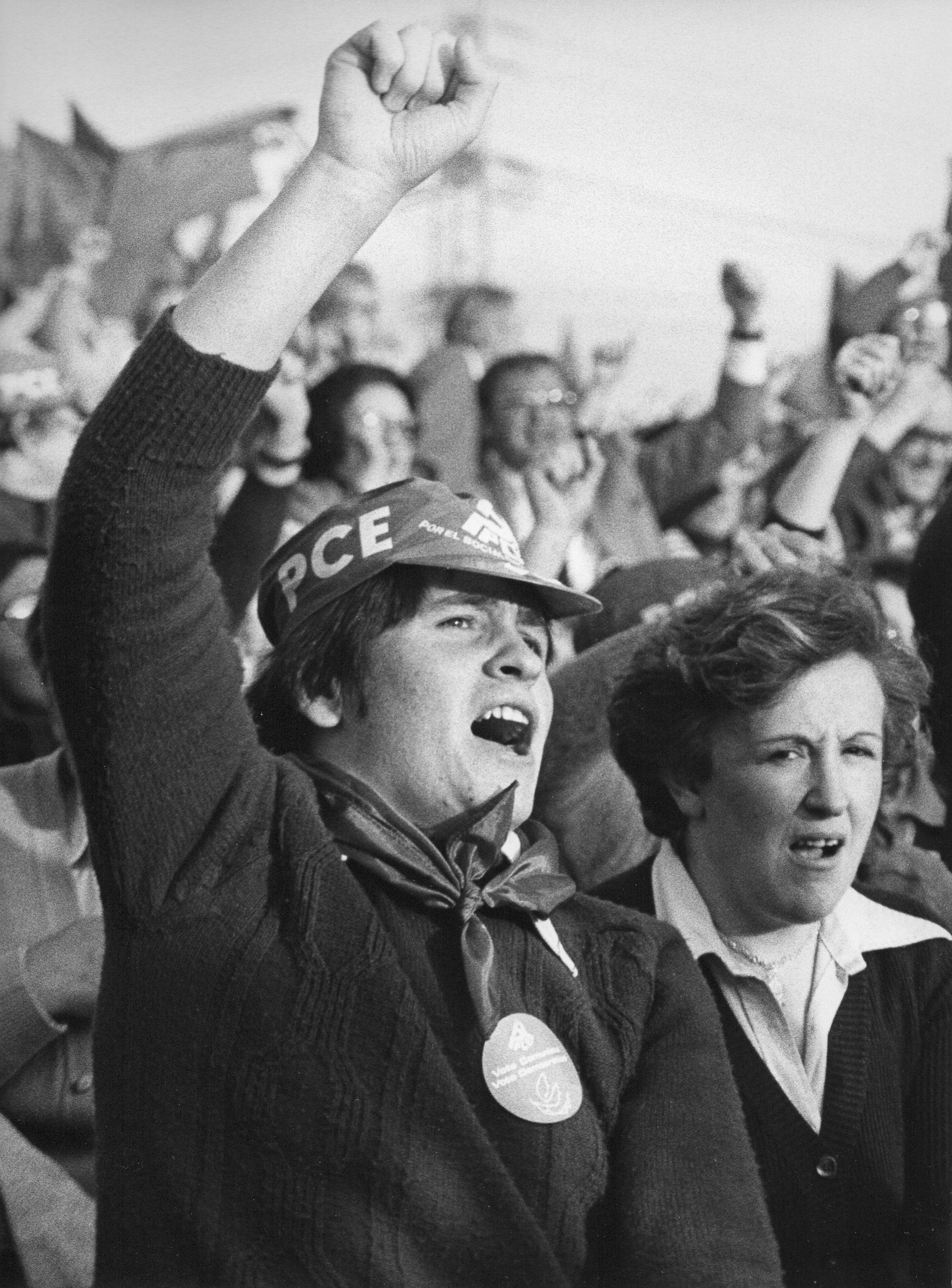
The first party of PCE in Spain's democratic transition period celebrated in Casa de Campo in 1977.

Feminists groups watched the process of creating a new Spanish constitution with concern. On 6 December 1978, a number of groups presented Cortes president Antonio Hernández Gil with a list of their concerns about it. Signatories included women who were members of UCD, PSOE, PC, MDM, ADM-PT and ORT-ULM. They wanted the constitution to commit the government to incorporating women into the workforce, that marriage should be based on equality of spouses, that marriages could be dissolved by mutual consent of either spouse, that every women should have the right to decide how many children she would have, and that women should have access to birth control. These women were opposed to Article 15, which said that "everyone has the right to life" (Spanish: todos tienen derecho a la vida) as they felt it could be interpreted as offering protection to fetuses. Their fears would be realized on 11 April 1985, when this constitutional wording was used to declare an abortion law illegal.

==== Spanish general elections of 1979 ====
The PCE adopted in their status at the 1978 Party Congress a statement that said they were "the vanguard political organization of the working class." At the same time, they also asserted they were "the progressive forces of Spain. In it are voluntarily integrated men and women proceeding from the working class, the peasantry, the forces of culture, and from other sectors of the population." Women were just one of many social groups the organization was trying to attract.

==== Spanish general elections of 1982 ====
Women voters in general favored centrist parties during the 1982 elections. PCE had the lowest percentages of women voters among all parties elected to the Cortes.
